

409001–409100 

|-bgcolor=#E9E9E9
| 409001 ||  || — || November 12, 2002 || Socorro || LINEAR || (194) || align=right | 2.1 km || 
|-id=002 bgcolor=#E9E9E9
| 409002 ||  || — || November 24, 2002 || Palomar || NEAT || — || align=right | 1.1 km || 
|-id=003 bgcolor=#E9E9E9
| 409003 ||  || — || December 6, 2002 || Socorro || LINEAR || (5) || align=right data-sort-value="0.87" | 870 m || 
|-id=004 bgcolor=#E9E9E9
| 409004 ||  || — || December 10, 2002 || Socorro || LINEAR || — || align=right | 1.2 km || 
|-id=005 bgcolor=#E9E9E9
| 409005 ||  || — || December 10, 2002 || Palomar || NEAT || — || align=right data-sort-value="0.94" | 940 m || 
|-id=006 bgcolor=#E9E9E9
| 409006 ||  || — || December 11, 2002 || Socorro || LINEAR || — || align=right | 1.1 km || 
|-id=007 bgcolor=#E9E9E9
| 409007 ||  || — || December 5, 2002 || Socorro || LINEAR || — || align=right data-sort-value="0.91" | 910 m || 
|-id=008 bgcolor=#E9E9E9
| 409008 ||  || — || December 5, 2002 || Socorro || LINEAR || — || align=right | 1.0 km || 
|-id=009 bgcolor=#E9E9E9
| 409009 ||  || — || December 7, 2002 || Palomar || NEAT || — || align=right data-sort-value="0.79" | 790 m || 
|-id=010 bgcolor=#E9E9E9
| 409010 ||  || — || December 10, 2002 || Palomar || NEAT || — || align=right | 1.0 km || 
|-id=011 bgcolor=#E9E9E9
| 409011 ||  || — || January 1, 2003 || Socorro || LINEAR || (5) || align=right data-sort-value="0.99" | 990 m || 
|-id=012 bgcolor=#E9E9E9
| 409012 ||  || — || January 5, 2003 || Kitt Peak || Spacewatch || (5) || align=right data-sort-value="0.80" | 800 m || 
|-id=013 bgcolor=#E9E9E9
| 409013 ||  || — || January 10, 2003 || Kitt Peak || Spacewatch || — || align=right | 1.2 km || 
|-id=014 bgcolor=#E9E9E9
| 409014 ||  || — || January 10, 2003 || Socorro || LINEAR || — || align=right | 2.8 km || 
|-id=015 bgcolor=#E9E9E9
| 409015 ||  || — || January 13, 2003 || Socorro || LINEAR || (5) || align=right | 1.0 km || 
|-id=016 bgcolor=#E9E9E9
| 409016 ||  || — || January 15, 2003 || Schiaparelli || L. Buzzi, F. Bellini || — || align=right | 1.1 km || 
|-id=017 bgcolor=#E9E9E9
| 409017 ||  || — || January 23, 2003 || Kitt Peak || Spacewatch || — || align=right | 1.8 km || 
|-id=018 bgcolor=#E9E9E9
| 409018 ||  || — || January 26, 2003 || Anderson Mesa || LONEOS || (5) || align=right | 1.0 km || 
|-id=019 bgcolor=#fefefe
| 409019 ||  || — || January 27, 2003 || Socorro || LINEAR || H || align=right data-sort-value="0.62" | 620 m || 
|-id=020 bgcolor=#E9E9E9
| 409020 ||  || — || January 30, 2003 || Anderson Mesa || LONEOS || — || align=right | 1.8 km || 
|-id=021 bgcolor=#E9E9E9
| 409021 ||  || — || February 1, 2003 || Haleakala || NEAT || — || align=right | 1.1 km || 
|-id=022 bgcolor=#FA8072
| 409022 ||  || — || March 6, 2003 || Anderson Mesa || LONEOS || H || align=right data-sort-value="0.68" | 680 m || 
|-id=023 bgcolor=#fefefe
| 409023 ||  || — || March 7, 2003 || Anderson Mesa || LONEOS || — || align=right data-sort-value="0.83" | 830 m || 
|-id=024 bgcolor=#E9E9E9
| 409024 ||  || — || March 9, 2003 || Anderson Mesa || LONEOS || — || align=right | 1.9 km || 
|-id=025 bgcolor=#E9E9E9
| 409025 ||  || — || March 8, 2003 || Anderson Mesa || LONEOS || JUN || align=right | 1.4 km || 
|-id=026 bgcolor=#fefefe
| 409026 ||  || — || March 23, 2003 || Kitt Peak || Spacewatch || — || align=right data-sort-value="0.72" | 720 m || 
|-id=027 bgcolor=#fefefe
| 409027 ||  || — || April 1, 2003 || Socorro || LINEAR || H || align=right data-sort-value="0.75" | 750 m || 
|-id=028 bgcolor=#fefefe
| 409028 ||  || — || April 4, 2003 || Kitt Peak || Spacewatch || — || align=right | 1.9 km || 
|-id=029 bgcolor=#fefefe
| 409029 ||  || — || April 4, 2003 || Kitt Peak || Spacewatch || — || align=right data-sort-value="0.63" | 630 m || 
|-id=030 bgcolor=#d6d6d6
| 409030 ||  || — || April 7, 2003 || Kitt Peak || Spacewatch || — || align=right | 2.8 km || 
|-id=031 bgcolor=#E9E9E9
| 409031 ||  || — || February 28, 2003 || Socorro || LINEAR || — || align=right | 2.4 km || 
|-id=032 bgcolor=#fefefe
| 409032 ||  || — || April 5, 2003 || Kitt Peak || Spacewatch || — || align=right data-sort-value="0.89" | 890 m || 
|-id=033 bgcolor=#E9E9E9
| 409033 ||  || — || May 10, 2003 || Kitt Peak || Spacewatch || — || align=right | 2.1 km || 
|-id=034 bgcolor=#FA8072
| 409034 ||  || — || June 23, 2003 || Anderson Mesa || LONEOS || — || align=right | 1.8 km || 
|-id=035 bgcolor=#fefefe
| 409035 ||  || — || May 27, 2003 || Kitt Peak || Spacewatch || — || align=right | 1.2 km || 
|-id=036 bgcolor=#fefefe
| 409036 ||  || — || July 1, 2003 || Haleakala || NEAT || — || align=right data-sort-value="0.97" | 970 m || 
|-id=037 bgcolor=#d6d6d6
| 409037 ||  || — || August 20, 2003 || Palomar || NEAT || — || align=right | 2.3 km || 
|-id=038 bgcolor=#d6d6d6
| 409038 ||  || — || August 4, 2003 || Kitt Peak || Spacewatch || — || align=right | 2.6 km || 
|-id=039 bgcolor=#d6d6d6
| 409039 ||  || — || August 22, 2003 || Palomar || NEAT || — || align=right | 5.1 km || 
|-id=040 bgcolor=#d6d6d6
| 409040 ||  || — || August 28, 2003 || Palomar || NEAT || — || align=right | 2.9 km || 
|-id=041 bgcolor=#d6d6d6
| 409041 ||  || — || September 15, 2003 || Palomar || NEAT || — || align=right | 2.6 km || 
|-id=042 bgcolor=#d6d6d6
| 409042 ||  || — || September 15, 2003 || Palomar || NEAT || — || align=right | 2.8 km || 
|-id=043 bgcolor=#d6d6d6
| 409043 ||  || — || September 15, 2003 || Palomar || NEAT || — || align=right | 3.8 km || 
|-id=044 bgcolor=#d6d6d6
| 409044 ||  || — || September 18, 2003 || Palomar || NEAT || TIR || align=right | 2.2 km || 
|-id=045 bgcolor=#d6d6d6
| 409045 ||  || — || September 18, 2003 || Socorro || LINEAR || — || align=right | 4.3 km || 
|-id=046 bgcolor=#d6d6d6
| 409046 ||  || — || September 16, 2003 || Palomar || NEAT || — || align=right | 6.3 km || 
|-id=047 bgcolor=#d6d6d6
| 409047 ||  || — || September 18, 2003 || Palomar || NEAT || — || align=right | 3.2 km || 
|-id=048 bgcolor=#fefefe
| 409048 ||  || — || September 17, 2003 || Kitt Peak || Spacewatch || — || align=right data-sort-value="0.82" | 820 m || 
|-id=049 bgcolor=#d6d6d6
| 409049 ||  || — || September 17, 2003 || Kitt Peak || Spacewatch || — || align=right | 2.4 km || 
|-id=050 bgcolor=#d6d6d6
| 409050 ||  || — || September 19, 2003 || Kitt Peak || Spacewatch || — || align=right | 3.4 km || 
|-id=051 bgcolor=#fefefe
| 409051 ||  || — || September 18, 2003 || Kitt Peak || Spacewatch || — || align=right data-sort-value="0.66" | 660 m || 
|-id=052 bgcolor=#fefefe
| 409052 ||  || — || September 18, 2003 || Socorro || LINEAR || NYS || align=right data-sort-value="0.71" | 710 m || 
|-id=053 bgcolor=#d6d6d6
| 409053 ||  || — || September 19, 2003 || Kitt Peak || Spacewatch || — || align=right | 3.7 km || 
|-id=054 bgcolor=#d6d6d6
| 409054 ||  || — || September 20, 2003 || Palomar || NEAT || — || align=right | 3.7 km || 
|-id=055 bgcolor=#d6d6d6
| 409055 ||  || — || September 20, 2003 || Palomar || NEAT || — || align=right | 3.9 km || 
|-id=056 bgcolor=#d6d6d6
| 409056 ||  || — || September 16, 2003 || Palomar || NEAT || — || align=right | 4.5 km || 
|-id=057 bgcolor=#d6d6d6
| 409057 ||  || — || September 18, 2003 || Palomar || NEAT || EOS || align=right | 1.9 km || 
|-id=058 bgcolor=#d6d6d6
| 409058 ||  || — || September 17, 2003 || Socorro || LINEAR || — || align=right | 2.6 km || 
|-id=059 bgcolor=#d6d6d6
| 409059 ||  || — || September 17, 2003 || Palomar || NEAT || — || align=right | 4.2 km || 
|-id=060 bgcolor=#d6d6d6
| 409060 ||  || — || September 18, 2003 || Kitt Peak || Spacewatch || — || align=right | 2.0 km || 
|-id=061 bgcolor=#d6d6d6
| 409061 ||  || — || September 18, 2003 || Kitt Peak || Spacewatch || — || align=right | 3.2 km || 
|-id=062 bgcolor=#d6d6d6
| 409062 ||  || — || September 21, 2003 || Kitt Peak || Spacewatch || — || align=right | 2.8 km || 
|-id=063 bgcolor=#d6d6d6
| 409063 ||  || — || September 21, 2003 || Kitt Peak || Spacewatch || — || align=right | 2.8 km || 
|-id=064 bgcolor=#d6d6d6
| 409064 ||  || — || September 21, 2003 || Kitt Peak || Spacewatch || THM || align=right | 2.3 km || 
|-id=065 bgcolor=#d6d6d6
| 409065 ||  || — || September 16, 2003 || Kitt Peak || Spacewatch || — || align=right | 3.2 km || 
|-id=066 bgcolor=#d6d6d6
| 409066 ||  || — || September 26, 2003 || Socorro || LINEAR || — || align=right | 4.7 km || 
|-id=067 bgcolor=#fefefe
| 409067 ||  || — || September 28, 2003 || Desert Eagle || W. K. Y. Yeung || — || align=right data-sort-value="0.91" | 910 m || 
|-id=068 bgcolor=#fefefe
| 409068 ||  || — || September 16, 2003 || Kitt Peak || Spacewatch || — || align=right data-sort-value="0.75" | 750 m || 
|-id=069 bgcolor=#fefefe
| 409069 ||  || — || September 26, 2003 || Socorro || LINEAR || NYS || align=right data-sort-value="0.70" | 700 m || 
|-id=070 bgcolor=#d6d6d6
| 409070 ||  || — || September 28, 2003 || Kitt Peak || Spacewatch || EOS || align=right | 2.4 km || 
|-id=071 bgcolor=#d6d6d6
| 409071 ||  || — || September 26, 2003 || Socorro || LINEAR || — || align=right | 2.8 km || 
|-id=072 bgcolor=#d6d6d6
| 409072 ||  || — || September 29, 2003 || Kitt Peak || Spacewatch || VER || align=right | 2.3 km || 
|-id=073 bgcolor=#d6d6d6
| 409073 ||  || — || September 30, 2003 || Socorro || LINEAR || LIX || align=right | 4.2 km || 
|-id=074 bgcolor=#d6d6d6
| 409074 ||  || — || September 18, 2003 || Palomar || NEAT || LIX || align=right | 3.5 km || 
|-id=075 bgcolor=#d6d6d6
| 409075 ||  || — || September 19, 2003 || Palomar || NEAT || — || align=right | 3.4 km || 
|-id=076 bgcolor=#fefefe
| 409076 ||  || — || September 30, 2003 || Socorro || LINEAR || H || align=right data-sort-value="0.82" | 820 m || 
|-id=077 bgcolor=#fefefe
| 409077 ||  || — || September 29, 2003 || Anderson Mesa || LONEOS || — || align=right data-sort-value="0.98" | 980 m || 
|-id=078 bgcolor=#d6d6d6
| 409078 ||  || — || September 29, 2003 || Anderson Mesa || LONEOS || TIR || align=right | 3.0 km || 
|-id=079 bgcolor=#fefefe
| 409079 ||  || — || September 16, 2003 || Palomar || NEAT || H || align=right data-sort-value="0.73" | 730 m || 
|-id=080 bgcolor=#d6d6d6
| 409080 ||  || — || September 17, 2003 || Kitt Peak || Spacewatch || — || align=right | 2.5 km || 
|-id=081 bgcolor=#d6d6d6
| 409081 ||  || — || September 18, 2003 || Palomar || NEAT || — || align=right | 3.9 km || 
|-id=082 bgcolor=#d6d6d6
| 409082 ||  || — || September 19, 2003 || Kitt Peak || Spacewatch || THB || align=right | 2.0 km || 
|-id=083 bgcolor=#fefefe
| 409083 ||  || — || September 19, 2003 || Kitt Peak || Spacewatch || V || align=right data-sort-value="0.77" | 770 m || 
|-id=084 bgcolor=#d6d6d6
| 409084 ||  || — || September 21, 2003 || Kitt Peak || Spacewatch || — || align=right | 2.6 km || 
|-id=085 bgcolor=#d6d6d6
| 409085 ||  || — || September 22, 2003 || Anderson Mesa || LONEOS || EOS || align=right | 2.0 km || 
|-id=086 bgcolor=#fefefe
| 409086 ||  || — || September 26, 2003 || Apache Point || SDSS || — || align=right data-sort-value="0.85" | 850 m || 
|-id=087 bgcolor=#fefefe
| 409087 ||  || — || September 26, 2003 || Apache Point || SDSS || MAS || align=right data-sort-value="0.54" | 540 m || 
|-id=088 bgcolor=#d6d6d6
| 409088 ||  || — || September 26, 2003 || Apache Point || SDSS || — || align=right | 3.0 km || 
|-id=089 bgcolor=#d6d6d6
| 409089 ||  || — || September 26, 2003 || Apache Point || SDSS || — || align=right | 3.7 km || 
|-id=090 bgcolor=#d6d6d6
| 409090 ||  || — || September 26, 2003 || Apache Point || SDSS || — || align=right | 3.1 km || 
|-id=091 bgcolor=#d6d6d6
| 409091 ||  || — || September 28, 2003 || Apache Point || SDSS || — || align=right | 3.1 km || 
|-id=092 bgcolor=#d6d6d6
| 409092 ||  || — || September 18, 2003 || Kitt Peak || Spacewatch || EOS || align=right | 1.8 km || 
|-id=093 bgcolor=#d6d6d6
| 409093 ||  || — || November 15, 1998 || Kitt Peak || Spacewatch || — || align=right | 2.4 km || 
|-id=094 bgcolor=#d6d6d6
| 409094 ||  || — || September 20, 2003 || Kitt Peak || Spacewatch || — || align=right | 3.6 km || 
|-id=095 bgcolor=#d6d6d6
| 409095 ||  || — || September 21, 2003 || Kitt Peak || Spacewatch || — || align=right | 2.4 km || 
|-id=096 bgcolor=#d6d6d6
| 409096 ||  || — || September 26, 2003 || Apache Point || SDSS || — || align=right | 2.1 km || 
|-id=097 bgcolor=#fefefe
| 409097 ||  || — || September 26, 2003 || Apache Point || SDSS || — || align=right data-sort-value="0.77" | 770 m || 
|-id=098 bgcolor=#d6d6d6
| 409098 ||  || — || September 26, 2003 || Apache Point || SDSS || — || align=right | 2.4 km || 
|-id=099 bgcolor=#fefefe
| 409099 ||  || — || September 26, 2003 || Apache Point || SDSS || — || align=right data-sort-value="0.63" | 630 m || 
|-id=100 bgcolor=#d6d6d6
| 409100 ||  || — || September 26, 2003 || Apache Point || SDSS || — || align=right | 2.9 km || 
|}

409101–409200 

|-bgcolor=#d6d6d6
| 409101 ||  || — || September 26, 2003 || Apache Point || SDSS || — || align=right | 2.5 km || 
|-id=102 bgcolor=#d6d6d6
| 409102 ||  || — || September 26, 2003 || Apache Point || SDSS || — || align=right | 3.3 km || 
|-id=103 bgcolor=#d6d6d6
| 409103 ||  || — || September 28, 2003 || Kitt Peak || Spacewatch || — || align=right | 2.0 km || 
|-id=104 bgcolor=#fefefe
| 409104 ||  || — || September 28, 2003 || Apache Point || SDSS || — || align=right data-sort-value="0.52" | 520 m || 
|-id=105 bgcolor=#d6d6d6
| 409105 ||  || — || September 18, 2003 || Kitt Peak || Spacewatch || — || align=right | 2.2 km || 
|-id=106 bgcolor=#d6d6d6
| 409106 ||  || — || September 18, 2003 || Kitt Peak || Spacewatch || — || align=right | 3.2 km || 
|-id=107 bgcolor=#d6d6d6
| 409107 ||  || — || September 20, 2003 || Kitt Peak || Spacewatch || — || align=right | 2.9 km || 
|-id=108 bgcolor=#fefefe
| 409108 ||  || — || September 22, 2003 || Kitt Peak || Spacewatch || MAS || align=right data-sort-value="0.75" | 750 m || 
|-id=109 bgcolor=#d6d6d6
| 409109 ||  || — || October 3, 2003 || Kitt Peak || Spacewatch || — || align=right | 2.6 km || 
|-id=110 bgcolor=#d6d6d6
| 409110 ||  || — || October 15, 2003 || Palomar || NEAT || — || align=right | 4.1 km || 
|-id=111 bgcolor=#d6d6d6
| 409111 ||  || — || September 21, 2003 || Campo Imperatore || CINEOS || EOS || align=right | 1.7 km || 
|-id=112 bgcolor=#d6d6d6
| 409112 ||  || — || October 1, 2003 || Kitt Peak || Spacewatch || — || align=right | 3.3 km || 
|-id=113 bgcolor=#d6d6d6
| 409113 ||  || — || October 1, 2003 || Kitt Peak || Spacewatch || — || align=right | 3.0 km || 
|-id=114 bgcolor=#d6d6d6
| 409114 ||  || — || October 3, 2003 || Kitt Peak || Spacewatch || — || align=right | 3.2 km || 
|-id=115 bgcolor=#d6d6d6
| 409115 ||  || — || October 3, 2003 || Kitt Peak || Spacewatch || — || align=right | 4.5 km || 
|-id=116 bgcolor=#d6d6d6
| 409116 ||  || — || October 3, 2003 || Kitt Peak || Spacewatch || — || align=right | 2.3 km || 
|-id=117 bgcolor=#fefefe
| 409117 ||  || — || October 5, 2003 || Kitt Peak || Spacewatch || — || align=right data-sort-value="0.81" | 810 m || 
|-id=118 bgcolor=#d6d6d6
| 409118 ||  || — || September 18, 2003 || Kitt Peak || Spacewatch || — || align=right | 3.2 km || 
|-id=119 bgcolor=#d6d6d6
| 409119 ||  || — || October 16, 2003 || Socorro || LINEAR || EUP || align=right | 5.9 km || 
|-id=120 bgcolor=#d6d6d6
| 409120 ||  || — || October 16, 2003 || Kitt Peak || Spacewatch || — || align=right | 3.6 km || 
|-id=121 bgcolor=#d6d6d6
| 409121 ||  || — || October 16, 2003 || Kitt Peak || Spacewatch || — || align=right | 4.7 km || 
|-id=122 bgcolor=#d6d6d6
| 409122 ||  || — || October 18, 2003 || Palomar || NEAT || — || align=right | 4.6 km || 
|-id=123 bgcolor=#d6d6d6
| 409123 ||  || — || October 16, 2003 || Anderson Mesa || LONEOS || LIX || align=right | 5.5 km || 
|-id=124 bgcolor=#fefefe
| 409124 ||  || — || October 20, 2003 || Kitt Peak || Spacewatch || — || align=right data-sort-value="0.85" | 850 m || 
|-id=125 bgcolor=#d6d6d6
| 409125 ||  || — || October 20, 2003 || Palomar || NEAT || TIR || align=right | 3.5 km || 
|-id=126 bgcolor=#d6d6d6
| 409126 ||  || — || October 19, 2003 || Anderson Mesa || LONEOS || — || align=right | 5.5 km || 
|-id=127 bgcolor=#fefefe
| 409127 ||  || — || October 20, 2003 || Kitt Peak || Spacewatch || H || align=right data-sort-value="0.85" | 850 m || 
|-id=128 bgcolor=#d6d6d6
| 409128 ||  || — || October 16, 2003 || Palomar || NEAT || — || align=right | 3.3 km || 
|-id=129 bgcolor=#d6d6d6
| 409129 ||  || — || September 22, 2003 || Kitt Peak || Spacewatch || — || align=right | 2.5 km || 
|-id=130 bgcolor=#d6d6d6
| 409130 ||  || — || September 28, 2003 || Kitt Peak || Spacewatch || EOS || align=right | 2.2 km || 
|-id=131 bgcolor=#d6d6d6
| 409131 ||  || — || October 16, 2003 || Palomar || NEAT || — || align=right | 4.2 km || 
|-id=132 bgcolor=#d6d6d6
| 409132 ||  || — || October 17, 2003 || Kitt Peak || Spacewatch || — || align=right | 3.9 km || 
|-id=133 bgcolor=#d6d6d6
| 409133 ||  || — || October 16, 2003 || Palomar || NEAT || — || align=right | 3.7 km || 
|-id=134 bgcolor=#d6d6d6
| 409134 ||  || — || October 17, 2003 || Nogales || Tenagra II Obs. || LIX || align=right | 4.6 km || 
|-id=135 bgcolor=#d6d6d6
| 409135 ||  || — || October 18, 2003 || Palomar || NEAT || — || align=right | 6.2 km || 
|-id=136 bgcolor=#d6d6d6
| 409136 ||  || — || October 18, 2003 || Palomar || NEAT || — || align=right | 3.5 km || 
|-id=137 bgcolor=#d6d6d6
| 409137 ||  || — || October 18, 2003 || Palomar || NEAT || — || align=right | 6.6 km || 
|-id=138 bgcolor=#d6d6d6
| 409138 ||  || — || October 16, 2003 || Anderson Mesa || LONEOS || — || align=right | 3.0 km || 
|-id=139 bgcolor=#fefefe
| 409139 ||  || — || October 16, 2003 || Palomar || NEAT || — || align=right data-sort-value="0.98" | 980 m || 
|-id=140 bgcolor=#d6d6d6
| 409140 ||  || — || September 16, 2003 || Kitt Peak || Spacewatch || EOS || align=right | 1.8 km || 
|-id=141 bgcolor=#d6d6d6
| 409141 ||  || — || October 17, 2003 || Anderson Mesa || LONEOS || — || align=right | 3.9 km || 
|-id=142 bgcolor=#d6d6d6
| 409142 ||  || — || October 17, 2003 || Anderson Mesa || LONEOS || — || align=right | 3.0 km || 
|-id=143 bgcolor=#fefefe
| 409143 ||  || — || October 17, 2003 || Anderson Mesa || LONEOS || H || align=right data-sort-value="0.95" | 950 m || 
|-id=144 bgcolor=#d6d6d6
| 409144 ||  || — || October 18, 2003 || Kitt Peak || Spacewatch || VER || align=right | 3.1 km || 
|-id=145 bgcolor=#d6d6d6
| 409145 ||  || — || October 18, 2003 || Kitt Peak || Spacewatch || — || align=right | 3.1 km || 
|-id=146 bgcolor=#fefefe
| 409146 ||  || — || October 18, 2003 || Kitt Peak || Spacewatch || V || align=right data-sort-value="0.77" | 770 m || 
|-id=147 bgcolor=#d6d6d6
| 409147 ||  || — || October 18, 2003 || Kitt Peak || Spacewatch || — || align=right | 3.7 km || 
|-id=148 bgcolor=#fefefe
| 409148 ||  || — || October 20, 2003 || Socorro || LINEAR || — || align=right data-sort-value="0.89" | 890 m || 
|-id=149 bgcolor=#d6d6d6
| 409149 ||  || — || October 20, 2003 || Palomar || NEAT || — || align=right | 4.9 km || 
|-id=150 bgcolor=#d6d6d6
| 409150 ||  || — || September 29, 2003 || Kitt Peak || Spacewatch || — || align=right | 3.5 km || 
|-id=151 bgcolor=#d6d6d6
| 409151 ||  || — || October 18, 2003 || Palomar || NEAT || EUP || align=right | 4.4 km || 
|-id=152 bgcolor=#d6d6d6
| 409152 ||  || — || October 21, 2003 || Kitt Peak || Spacewatch || — || align=right | 3.1 km || 
|-id=153 bgcolor=#fefefe
| 409153 ||  || — || October 21, 2003 || Kitt Peak || Spacewatch || — || align=right data-sort-value="0.84" | 840 m || 
|-id=154 bgcolor=#E9E9E9
| 409154 ||  || — || October 19, 2003 || Palomar || NEAT || — || align=right | 2.6 km || 
|-id=155 bgcolor=#d6d6d6
| 409155 ||  || — || October 21, 2003 || Palomar || NEAT || — || align=right | 3.8 km || 
|-id=156 bgcolor=#fefefe
| 409156 ||  || — || October 20, 2003 || Socorro || LINEAR || — || align=right data-sort-value="0.85" | 850 m || 
|-id=157 bgcolor=#d6d6d6
| 409157 ||  || — || October 21, 2003 || Kitt Peak || Spacewatch || EOS || align=right | 2.2 km || 
|-id=158 bgcolor=#d6d6d6
| 409158 ||  || — || October 20, 2003 || Socorro || LINEAR || — || align=right | 3.6 km || 
|-id=159 bgcolor=#d6d6d6
| 409159 ||  || — || October 21, 2003 || Kitt Peak || Spacewatch || — || align=right | 4.8 km || 
|-id=160 bgcolor=#d6d6d6
| 409160 ||  || — || October 21, 2003 || Palomar || NEAT || THM || align=right | 2.2 km || 
|-id=161 bgcolor=#d6d6d6
| 409161 ||  || — || October 23, 2003 || Anderson Mesa || LONEOS || — || align=right | 3.6 km || 
|-id=162 bgcolor=#fefefe
| 409162 ||  || — || September 28, 2003 || Kitt Peak || Spacewatch || — || align=right data-sort-value="0.82" | 820 m || 
|-id=163 bgcolor=#fefefe
| 409163 ||  || — || October 21, 2003 || Kitt Peak || Spacewatch || MAS || align=right data-sort-value="0.70" | 700 m || 
|-id=164 bgcolor=#fefefe
| 409164 ||  || — || October 22, 2003 || Socorro || LINEAR || — || align=right data-sort-value="0.74" | 740 m || 
|-id=165 bgcolor=#fefefe
| 409165 ||  || — || October 22, 2003 || Kitt Peak || Spacewatch || — || align=right data-sort-value="0.77" | 770 m || 
|-id=166 bgcolor=#fefefe
| 409166 ||  || — || October 23, 2003 || Kitt Peak || Spacewatch || (5026) || align=right data-sort-value="0.81" | 810 m || 
|-id=167 bgcolor=#d6d6d6
| 409167 ||  || — || October 24, 2003 || Socorro || LINEAR || — || align=right | 3.1 km || 
|-id=168 bgcolor=#d6d6d6
| 409168 ||  || — || September 27, 2003 || Kitt Peak || Spacewatch || THM || align=right | 2.4 km || 
|-id=169 bgcolor=#fefefe
| 409169 ||  || — || October 21, 2003 || Socorro || LINEAR || — || align=right data-sort-value="0.91" | 910 m || 
|-id=170 bgcolor=#d6d6d6
| 409170 ||  || — || October 23, 2003 || Anderson Mesa || LONEOS || — || align=right | 5.0 km || 
|-id=171 bgcolor=#fefefe
| 409171 ||  || — || October 23, 2003 || Anderson Mesa || LONEOS || — || align=right data-sort-value="0.87" | 870 m || 
|-id=172 bgcolor=#fefefe
| 409172 ||  || — || September 22, 2003 || Kitt Peak || Spacewatch || — || align=right data-sort-value="0.62" | 620 m || 
|-id=173 bgcolor=#d6d6d6
| 409173 ||  || — || October 24, 2003 || Socorro || LINEAR || — || align=right | 3.2 km || 
|-id=174 bgcolor=#d6d6d6
| 409174 ||  || — || October 24, 2003 || Kitt Peak || Spacewatch || LIX || align=right | 4.2 km || 
|-id=175 bgcolor=#d6d6d6
| 409175 ||  || — || October 24, 2003 || Kitt Peak || Spacewatch || — || align=right | 3.8 km || 
|-id=176 bgcolor=#d6d6d6
| 409176 ||  || — || October 25, 2003 || Socorro || LINEAR || — || align=right | 4.3 km || 
|-id=177 bgcolor=#d6d6d6
| 409177 ||  || — || October 24, 2003 || Kitt Peak || Spacewatch || — || align=right | 4.2 km || 
|-id=178 bgcolor=#fefefe
| 409178 ||  || — || October 29, 2003 || Anderson Mesa || LONEOS || — || align=right | 1.3 km || 
|-id=179 bgcolor=#fefefe
| 409179 ||  || — || October 16, 2003 || Kitt Peak || Spacewatch || MAS || align=right data-sort-value="0.61" | 610 m || 
|-id=180 bgcolor=#fefefe
| 409180 ||  || — || October 16, 2003 || Kitt Peak || Spacewatch || — || align=right | 1.0 km || 
|-id=181 bgcolor=#fefefe
| 409181 ||  || — || October 16, 2003 || Kitt Peak || Spacewatch || — || align=right data-sort-value="0.98" | 980 m || 
|-id=182 bgcolor=#d6d6d6
| 409182 ||  || — || September 27, 2003 || Kitt Peak || Spacewatch || critical || align=right | 2.5 km || 
|-id=183 bgcolor=#d6d6d6
| 409183 ||  || — || September 27, 2003 || Kitt Peak || Spacewatch || HYG || align=right | 2.8 km || 
|-id=184 bgcolor=#d6d6d6
| 409184 ||  || — || October 16, 2003 || Kitt Peak || Spacewatch || — || align=right | 2.6 km || 
|-id=185 bgcolor=#fefefe
| 409185 ||  || — || October 19, 2003 || Kitt Peak || Spacewatch || MAS || align=right data-sort-value="0.76" | 760 m || 
|-id=186 bgcolor=#fefefe
| 409186 ||  || — || October 27, 2003 || Kitt Peak || Spacewatch || MAS || align=right data-sort-value="0.54" | 540 m || 
|-id=187 bgcolor=#fefefe
| 409187 ||  || — || October 20, 2003 || Socorro || LINEAR || — || align=right data-sort-value="0.75" | 750 m || 
|-id=188 bgcolor=#d6d6d6
| 409188 ||  || — || October 23, 2003 || Kitt Peak || Spacewatch || — || align=right | 2.7 km || 
|-id=189 bgcolor=#fefefe
| 409189 ||  || — || October 18, 2003 || Apache Point || SDSS || — || align=right data-sort-value="0.82" | 820 m || 
|-id=190 bgcolor=#d6d6d6
| 409190 ||  || — || October 19, 2003 || Apache Point || SDSS || — || align=right | 3.5 km || 
|-id=191 bgcolor=#d6d6d6
| 409191 ||  || — || September 18, 2003 || Kitt Peak || Spacewatch || — || align=right | 2.6 km || 
|-id=192 bgcolor=#fefefe
| 409192 ||  || — || October 17, 2003 || Apache Point || SDSS || V || align=right data-sort-value="0.65" | 650 m || 
|-id=193 bgcolor=#d6d6d6
| 409193 ||  || — || October 17, 2003 || Apache Point || SDSS || — || align=right | 4.4 km || 
|-id=194 bgcolor=#d6d6d6
| 409194 ||  || — || October 18, 2003 || Kitt Peak || Spacewatch || EOS || align=right | 3.3 km || 
|-id=195 bgcolor=#d6d6d6
| 409195 ||  || — || October 19, 2003 || Apache Point || SDSS || — || align=right | 2.5 km || 
|-id=196 bgcolor=#d6d6d6
| 409196 ||  || — || October 22, 2003 || Apache Point || SDSS || EOS || align=right | 1.8 km || 
|-id=197 bgcolor=#fefefe
| 409197 ||  || — || October 22, 2003 || Apache Point || SDSS || — || align=right data-sort-value="0.71" | 710 m || 
|-id=198 bgcolor=#fefefe
| 409198 ||  || — || October 22, 2003 || Kitt Peak || Spacewatch || H || align=right data-sort-value="0.80" | 800 m || 
|-id=199 bgcolor=#d6d6d6
| 409199 ||  || — || October 21, 2003 || Palomar || NEAT || — || align=right | 4.8 km || 
|-id=200 bgcolor=#fefefe
| 409200 ||  || — || November 15, 2003 || Kitt Peak || Spacewatch || — || align=right data-sort-value="0.79" | 790 m || 
|}

409201–409300 

|-bgcolor=#fefefe
| 409201 || 2003 WS || — || November 16, 2003 || Catalina || CSS || NYS || align=right data-sort-value="0.54" | 540 m || 
|-id=202 bgcolor=#d6d6d6
| 409202 ||  || — || November 18, 2003 || Kitt Peak || Spacewatch || — || align=right | 3.9 km || 
|-id=203 bgcolor=#fefefe
| 409203 ||  || — || November 18, 2003 || Palomar || NEAT || — || align=right data-sort-value="0.78" | 780 m || 
|-id=204 bgcolor=#FFC2E0
| 409204 ||  || — || November 21, 2003 || Socorro || LINEAR || AMO || align=right data-sort-value="0.66" | 660 m || 
|-id=205 bgcolor=#fefefe
| 409205 ||  || — || November 16, 2003 || Kitt Peak || Spacewatch || — || align=right data-sort-value="0.99" | 990 m || 
|-id=206 bgcolor=#fefefe
| 409206 ||  || — || November 16, 2003 || Kitt Peak || Spacewatch || MAS || align=right data-sort-value="0.73" | 730 m || 
|-id=207 bgcolor=#fefefe
| 409207 ||  || — || November 19, 2003 || Kitt Peak || Spacewatch || NYS || align=right data-sort-value="0.79" | 790 m || 
|-id=208 bgcolor=#fefefe
| 409208 ||  || — || November 19, 2003 || Palomar || NEAT || V || align=right data-sort-value="0.68" | 680 m || 
|-id=209 bgcolor=#d6d6d6
| 409209 ||  || — || November 19, 2003 || Palomar || NEAT || — || align=right | 3.9 km || 
|-id=210 bgcolor=#d6d6d6
| 409210 ||  || — || November 19, 2003 || Socorro || LINEAR || — || align=right | 5.5 km || 
|-id=211 bgcolor=#fefefe
| 409211 ||  || — || November 18, 2003 || Kitt Peak || Spacewatch || MAS || align=right data-sort-value="0.80" | 800 m || 
|-id=212 bgcolor=#fefefe
| 409212 ||  || — || October 28, 2003 || Socorro || LINEAR || — || align=right data-sort-value="0.87" | 870 m || 
|-id=213 bgcolor=#d6d6d6
| 409213 ||  || — || November 20, 2003 || Socorro || LINEAR || — || align=right | 4.4 km || 
|-id=214 bgcolor=#FA8072
| 409214 ||  || — || November 21, 2003 || Socorro || LINEAR || — || align=right | 1.0 km || 
|-id=215 bgcolor=#fefefe
| 409215 ||  || — || November 18, 2003 || Palomar || NEAT || NYS || align=right data-sort-value="0.59" | 590 m || 
|-id=216 bgcolor=#d6d6d6
| 409216 ||  || — || November 19, 2003 || Anderson Mesa || LONEOS || — || align=right | 3.9 km || 
|-id=217 bgcolor=#fefefe
| 409217 ||  || — || October 20, 2003 || Kitt Peak || Spacewatch || — || align=right data-sort-value="0.73" | 730 m || 
|-id=218 bgcolor=#d6d6d6
| 409218 ||  || — || November 23, 2003 || Socorro || LINEAR || TIR || align=right | 3.6 km || 
|-id=219 bgcolor=#fefefe
| 409219 ||  || — || November 23, 2003 || Kitt Peak || Spacewatch || — || align=right data-sort-value="0.85" | 850 m || 
|-id=220 bgcolor=#d6d6d6
| 409220 ||  || — || November 19, 2003 || Catalina || CSS || — || align=right | 5.1 km || 
|-id=221 bgcolor=#d6d6d6
| 409221 ||  || — || November 18, 2003 || Kitt Peak || Spacewatch || THM || align=right | 2.6 km || 
|-id=222 bgcolor=#fefefe
| 409222 ||  || — || November 19, 2003 || Kitt Peak || Spacewatch || — || align=right data-sort-value="0.88" | 880 m || 
|-id=223 bgcolor=#fefefe
| 409223 ||  || — || December 17, 2003 || Socorro || LINEAR || H || align=right data-sort-value="0.65" | 650 m || 
|-id=224 bgcolor=#d6d6d6
| 409224 ||  || — || December 17, 2003 || Kitt Peak || Spacewatch || Tj (2.99) || align=right | 2.0 km || 
|-id=225 bgcolor=#fefefe
| 409225 ||  || — || December 19, 2003 || Kitt Peak || Spacewatch || V || align=right data-sort-value="0.69" | 690 m || 
|-id=226 bgcolor=#fefefe
| 409226 ||  || — || December 18, 2003 || Kitt Peak || Spacewatch || NYS || align=right data-sort-value="0.65" | 650 m || 
|-id=227 bgcolor=#fefefe
| 409227 ||  || — || December 21, 2003 || Socorro || LINEAR || — || align=right data-sort-value="0.76" | 760 m || 
|-id=228 bgcolor=#fefefe
| 409228 ||  || — || December 19, 2003 || Socorro || LINEAR || — || align=right | 1.4 km || 
|-id=229 bgcolor=#d6d6d6
| 409229 ||  || — || December 22, 2003 || Socorro || LINEAR || Tj (2.95) || align=right | 3.2 km || 
|-id=230 bgcolor=#fefefe
| 409230 ||  || — || November 26, 2003 || Socorro || LINEAR || V || align=right data-sort-value="0.82" | 820 m || 
|-id=231 bgcolor=#E9E9E9
| 409231 ||  || — || December 17, 2003 || Kitt Peak || Spacewatch || — || align=right | 1.1 km || 
|-id=232 bgcolor=#E9E9E9
| 409232 ||  || — || January 13, 2004 || Anderson Mesa || LONEOS || — || align=right | 1.5 km || 
|-id=233 bgcolor=#fefefe
| 409233 ||  || — || January 21, 2004 || Socorro || LINEAR || — || align=right data-sort-value="0.75" | 750 m || 
|-id=234 bgcolor=#E9E9E9
| 409234 ||  || — || January 16, 2004 || Palomar || NEAT || — || align=right data-sort-value="0.90" | 900 m || 
|-id=235 bgcolor=#fefefe
| 409235 ||  || — || January 16, 2004 || Palomar || NEAT || — || align=right | 1.1 km || 
|-id=236 bgcolor=#E9E9E9
| 409236 ||  || — || February 11, 2004 || Palomar || NEAT || — || align=right | 1.0 km || 
|-id=237 bgcolor=#E9E9E9
| 409237 ||  || — || February 15, 2004 || Socorro || LINEAR || — || align=right | 1.2 km || 
|-id=238 bgcolor=#E9E9E9
| 409238 ||  || — || February 13, 2004 || Palomar || NEAT || — || align=right | 1.5 km || 
|-id=239 bgcolor=#E9E9E9
| 409239 ||  || — || February 17, 2004 || Catalina || CSS || — || align=right | 1.3 km || 
|-id=240 bgcolor=#E9E9E9
| 409240 ||  || — || February 29, 2004 || Kitt Peak || Spacewatch || — || align=right | 1.8 km || 
|-id=241 bgcolor=#E9E9E9
| 409241 ||  || — || March 12, 2004 || Palomar || NEAT || — || align=right | 1.7 km || 
|-id=242 bgcolor=#E9E9E9
| 409242 ||  || — || March 15, 2004 || Catalina || CSS || — || align=right | 1.7 km || 
|-id=243 bgcolor=#E9E9E9
| 409243 ||  || — || March 14, 2004 || Kitt Peak || Spacewatch || — || align=right | 1.9 km || 
|-id=244 bgcolor=#E9E9E9
| 409244 ||  || — || March 15, 2004 || Catalina || CSS || — || align=right | 1.7 km || 
|-id=245 bgcolor=#E9E9E9
| 409245 ||  || — || March 15, 2004 || Kitt Peak || Spacewatch || — || align=right | 1.4 km || 
|-id=246 bgcolor=#E9E9E9
| 409246 ||  || — || March 15, 2004 || Socorro || LINEAR || — || align=right | 1.2 km || 
|-id=247 bgcolor=#E9E9E9
| 409247 ||  || — || March 15, 2004 || Catalina || CSS || ADE || align=right | 2.1 km || 
|-id=248 bgcolor=#E9E9E9
| 409248 ||  || — || March 17, 2004 || Kitt Peak || Spacewatch || — || align=right | 1.5 km || 
|-id=249 bgcolor=#E9E9E9
| 409249 ||  || — || March 17, 2004 || Kitt Peak || Spacewatch || critical || align=right data-sort-value="0.78" | 780 m || 
|-id=250 bgcolor=#E9E9E9
| 409250 ||  || — || March 19, 2004 || Socorro || LINEAR || — || align=right | 1.8 km || 
|-id=251 bgcolor=#E9E9E9
| 409251 ||  || — || March 20, 2004 || Socorro || LINEAR || — || align=right | 1.1 km || 
|-id=252 bgcolor=#E9E9E9
| 409252 ||  || — || March 16, 2004 || Valmeca || Valmeca Obs. || — || align=right | 1.4 km || 
|-id=253 bgcolor=#E9E9E9
| 409253 ||  || — || March 26, 2004 || Socorro || LINEAR || — || align=right | 2.0 km || 
|-id=254 bgcolor=#E9E9E9
| 409254 ||  || — || April 13, 2004 || Palomar || NEAT || — || align=right | 1.6 km || 
|-id=255 bgcolor=#E9E9E9
| 409255 ||  || — || March 30, 2004 || Siding Spring || SSS || — || align=right | 3.2 km || 
|-id=256 bgcolor=#FFC2E0
| 409256 ||  || — || April 19, 2004 || Socorro || LINEAR || AMO +1km || align=right | 1.9 km || 
|-id=257 bgcolor=#E9E9E9
| 409257 ||  || — || April 21, 2004 || Catalina || CSS || — || align=right | 2.3 km || 
|-id=258 bgcolor=#E9E9E9
| 409258 ||  || — || April 24, 2004 || Siding Spring || SSS || EUN || align=right | 1.5 km || 
|-id=259 bgcolor=#E9E9E9
| 409259 ||  || — || May 9, 2004 || Palomar || NEAT || EUN || align=right | 1.6 km || 
|-id=260 bgcolor=#E9E9E9
| 409260 ||  || — || June 13, 2004 || Kitt Peak || Spacewatch || — || align=right | 1.7 km || 
|-id=261 bgcolor=#fefefe
| 409261 ||  || — || June 14, 2004 || Kitt Peak || Spacewatch || — || align=right data-sort-value="0.68" | 680 m || 
|-id=262 bgcolor=#d6d6d6
| 409262 ||  || — || August 10, 2004 || Socorro || LINEAR || — || align=right | 3.0 km || 
|-id=263 bgcolor=#FA8072
| 409263 ||  || — || August 11, 2004 || Socorro || LINEAR || — || align=right data-sort-value="0.79" | 790 m || 
|-id=264 bgcolor=#fefefe
| 409264 ||  || — || August 11, 2004 || Socorro || LINEAR || — || align=right data-sort-value="0.86" | 860 m || 
|-id=265 bgcolor=#d6d6d6
| 409265 ||  || — || August 13, 2004 || Palomar || NEAT || — || align=right | 2.8 km || 
|-id=266 bgcolor=#FFC2E0
| 409266 ||  || — || September 7, 2004 || Socorro || LINEAR || AMO || align=right data-sort-value="0.20" | 200 m || 
|-id=267 bgcolor=#FA8072
| 409267 ||  || — || September 7, 2004 || Socorro || LINEAR || — || align=right data-sort-value="0.79" | 790 m || 
|-id=268 bgcolor=#fefefe
| 409268 ||  || — || September 7, 2004 || Kitt Peak || Spacewatch || — || align=right data-sort-value="0.64" | 640 m || 
|-id=269 bgcolor=#fefefe
| 409269 ||  || — || September 7, 2004 || Socorro || LINEAR || — || align=right data-sort-value="0.82" | 820 m || 
|-id=270 bgcolor=#fefefe
| 409270 ||  || — || September 7, 2004 || Uccle || T. Pauwels || — || align=right data-sort-value="0.89" | 890 m || 
|-id=271 bgcolor=#d6d6d6
| 409271 ||  || — || September 7, 2004 || Socorro || LINEAR || — || align=right | 2.9 km || 
|-id=272 bgcolor=#fefefe
| 409272 ||  || — || September 8, 2004 || Socorro || LINEAR || — || align=right data-sort-value="0.85" | 850 m || 
|-id=273 bgcolor=#fefefe
| 409273 ||  || — || August 9, 2004 || Campo Imperatore || CINEOS || — || align=right data-sort-value="0.66" | 660 m || 
|-id=274 bgcolor=#d6d6d6
| 409274 ||  || — || September 8, 2004 || Socorro || LINEAR || — || align=right | 2.8 km || 
|-id=275 bgcolor=#d6d6d6
| 409275 ||  || — || September 8, 2004 || Socorro || LINEAR || — || align=right | 2.2 km || 
|-id=276 bgcolor=#fefefe
| 409276 ||  || — || September 10, 2004 || Socorro || LINEAR || — || align=right data-sort-value="0.67" | 670 m || 
|-id=277 bgcolor=#d6d6d6
| 409277 ||  || — || September 10, 2004 || Socorro || LINEAR || — || align=right | 2.6 km || 
|-id=278 bgcolor=#fefefe
| 409278 ||  || — || September 10, 2004 || Socorro || LINEAR || — || align=right data-sort-value="0.64" | 640 m || 
|-id=279 bgcolor=#d6d6d6
| 409279 ||  || — || September 7, 2004 || Socorro || LINEAR || — || align=right | 3.0 km || 
|-id=280 bgcolor=#d6d6d6
| 409280 ||  || — || September 11, 2004 || Socorro || LINEAR || — || align=right | 2.6 km || 
|-id=281 bgcolor=#fefefe
| 409281 ||  || — || September 11, 2004 || Kitt Peak || Spacewatch || — || align=right data-sort-value="0.55" | 550 m || 
|-id=282 bgcolor=#d6d6d6
| 409282 ||  || — || September 11, 2004 || Socorro || LINEAR || — || align=right | 2.5 km || 
|-id=283 bgcolor=#fefefe
| 409283 ||  || — || September 8, 2004 || Socorro || LINEAR || — || align=right data-sort-value="0.77" | 770 m || 
|-id=284 bgcolor=#fefefe
| 409284 ||  || — || September 10, 2004 || Socorro || LINEAR || — || align=right data-sort-value="0.69" | 690 m || 
|-id=285 bgcolor=#d6d6d6
| 409285 ||  || — || September 11, 2004 || Kitt Peak || Spacewatch || — || align=right | 1.8 km || 
|-id=286 bgcolor=#d6d6d6
| 409286 ||  || — || September 15, 2004 || Saint-Sulpice || B. Christophe || — || align=right | 2.2 km || 
|-id=287 bgcolor=#fefefe
| 409287 ||  || — || September 15, 2004 || Anderson Mesa || LONEOS || H || align=right data-sort-value="0.68" | 680 m || 
|-id=288 bgcolor=#d6d6d6
| 409288 ||  || — || September 11, 2004 || Kitt Peak || Spacewatch || — || align=right | 2.2 km || 
|-id=289 bgcolor=#d6d6d6
| 409289 ||  || — || August 25, 2004 || Kitt Peak || Spacewatch || — || align=right | 2.1 km || 
|-id=290 bgcolor=#d6d6d6
| 409290 ||  || — || September 11, 2004 || Kitt Peak || Spacewatch || — || align=right | 2.1 km || 
|-id=291 bgcolor=#d6d6d6
| 409291 ||  || — || September 15, 2004 || Kitt Peak || Spacewatch || EOS || align=right | 1.6 km || 
|-id=292 bgcolor=#d6d6d6
| 409292 ||  || — || September 18, 2004 || Socorro || LINEAR || BRA || align=right | 1.7 km || 
|-id=293 bgcolor=#fefefe
| 409293 ||  || — || September 17, 2004 || Socorro || LINEAR || — || align=right data-sort-value="0.82" | 820 m || 
|-id=294 bgcolor=#d6d6d6
| 409294 ||  || — || September 18, 2004 || Socorro || LINEAR || — || align=right | 3.2 km || 
|-id=295 bgcolor=#d6d6d6
| 409295 ||  || — || September 18, 2004 || Socorro || LINEAR || — || align=right | 2.5 km || 
|-id=296 bgcolor=#FA8072
| 409296 ||  || — || August 27, 2004 || Anderson Mesa || LONEOS || — || align=right data-sort-value="0.90" | 900 m || 
|-id=297 bgcolor=#d6d6d6
| 409297 ||  || — || October 4, 2004 || Kitt Peak || Spacewatch || — || align=right | 2.3 km || 
|-id=298 bgcolor=#fefefe
| 409298 ||  || — || October 4, 2004 || Kitt Peak || Spacewatch || V || align=right data-sort-value="0.97" | 970 m || 
|-id=299 bgcolor=#fefefe
| 409299 ||  || — || October 5, 2004 || Anderson Mesa || LONEOS || H || align=right data-sort-value="0.75" | 750 m || 
|-id=300 bgcolor=#FA8072
| 409300 ||  || — || October 15, 2004 || Socorro || LINEAR || H || align=right data-sort-value="0.65" | 650 m || 
|}

409301–409400 

|-bgcolor=#d6d6d6
| 409301 ||  || — || October 4, 2004 || Kitt Peak || Spacewatch || critical || align=right | 2.2 km || 
|-id=302 bgcolor=#d6d6d6
| 409302 ||  || — || October 4, 2004 || Kitt Peak || Spacewatch || EOS || align=right | 1.8 km || 
|-id=303 bgcolor=#d6d6d6
| 409303 ||  || — || October 4, 2004 || Kitt Peak || Spacewatch || — || align=right | 2.1 km || 
|-id=304 bgcolor=#d6d6d6
| 409304 ||  || — || October 5, 2004 || Kitt Peak || Spacewatch || — || align=right | 2.4 km || 
|-id=305 bgcolor=#d6d6d6
| 409305 ||  || — || September 22, 2004 || Socorro || LINEAR || — || align=right | 3.8 km || 
|-id=306 bgcolor=#d6d6d6
| 409306 ||  || — || October 7, 2004 || Kitt Peak || Spacewatch || — || align=right | 2.0 km || 
|-id=307 bgcolor=#d6d6d6
| 409307 ||  || — || October 5, 2004 || Kitt Peak || Spacewatch || — || align=right | 2.3 km || 
|-id=308 bgcolor=#fefefe
| 409308 ||  || — || October 6, 2004 || Palomar || NEAT || H || align=right data-sort-value="0.85" | 850 m || 
|-id=309 bgcolor=#d6d6d6
| 409309 ||  || — || October 7, 2004 || Socorro || LINEAR || — || align=right | 3.3 km || 
|-id=310 bgcolor=#fefefe
| 409310 ||  || — || September 17, 2004 || Socorro || LINEAR || — || align=right data-sort-value="0.85" | 850 m || 
|-id=311 bgcolor=#fefefe
| 409311 ||  || — || September 15, 2004 || Kitt Peak || Spacewatch || — || align=right data-sort-value="0.59" | 590 m || 
|-id=312 bgcolor=#d6d6d6
| 409312 ||  || — || October 6, 2004 || Kitt Peak || Spacewatch || — || align=right | 2.7 km || 
|-id=313 bgcolor=#d6d6d6
| 409313 ||  || — || October 7, 2004 || Kitt Peak || Spacewatch || — || align=right | 2.9 km || 
|-id=314 bgcolor=#d6d6d6
| 409314 ||  || — || October 7, 2004 || Kitt Peak || Spacewatch || — || align=right | 3.8 km || 
|-id=315 bgcolor=#d6d6d6
| 409315 ||  || — || October 7, 2004 || Kitt Peak || Spacewatch || — || align=right | 2.3 km || 
|-id=316 bgcolor=#d6d6d6
| 409316 ||  || — || October 7, 2004 || Kitt Peak || Spacewatch || — || align=right | 3.9 km || 
|-id=317 bgcolor=#fefefe
| 409317 ||  || — || October 7, 2004 || Kitt Peak || Spacewatch || — || align=right data-sort-value="0.81" | 810 m || 
|-id=318 bgcolor=#fefefe
| 409318 ||  || — || September 8, 2004 || Socorro || LINEAR || — || align=right data-sort-value="0.71" | 710 m || 
|-id=319 bgcolor=#fefefe
| 409319 ||  || — || October 9, 2004 || Kitt Peak || Spacewatch || — || align=right data-sort-value="0.55" | 550 m || 
|-id=320 bgcolor=#fefefe
| 409320 ||  || — || October 9, 2004 || Kitt Peak || Spacewatch || — || align=right data-sort-value="0.67" | 670 m || 
|-id=321 bgcolor=#d6d6d6
| 409321 ||  || — || October 10, 2004 || Kitt Peak || Spacewatch || — || align=right | 4.1 km || 
|-id=322 bgcolor=#fefefe
| 409322 ||  || — || October 9, 2004 || Kitt Peak || Spacewatch || V || align=right data-sort-value="0.65" | 650 m || 
|-id=323 bgcolor=#d6d6d6
| 409323 ||  || — || October 13, 2004 || Kitt Peak || Spacewatch || — || align=right | 2.8 km || 
|-id=324 bgcolor=#d6d6d6
| 409324 ||  || — || October 10, 2004 || Kitt Peak || M. W. Buie || — || align=right | 2.8 km || 
|-id=325 bgcolor=#d6d6d6
| 409325 ||  || — || October 10, 2004 || Kitt Peak || Spacewatch || EOS || align=right | 1.6 km || 
|-id=326 bgcolor=#fefefe
| 409326 ||  || — || October 4, 2004 || Kitt Peak || Spacewatch || — || align=right data-sort-value="0.61" | 610 m || 
|-id=327 bgcolor=#d6d6d6
| 409327 ||  || — || October 10, 2004 || Socorro || LINEAR || — || align=right | 3.6 km || 
|-id=328 bgcolor=#fefefe
| 409328 ||  || — || October 7, 2004 || Kitt Peak || Spacewatch || — || align=right data-sort-value="0.96" | 960 m || 
|-id=329 bgcolor=#d6d6d6
| 409329 ||  || — || October 7, 2004 || Kitt Peak || Spacewatch || — || align=right | 2.6 km || 
|-id=330 bgcolor=#fefefe
| 409330 ||  || — || October 5, 2004 || Kitt Peak || Spacewatch || — || align=right data-sort-value="0.78" | 780 m || 
|-id=331 bgcolor=#d6d6d6
| 409331 ||  || — || November 3, 2004 || Anderson Mesa || LONEOS || — || align=right | 1.5 km || 
|-id=332 bgcolor=#fefefe
| 409332 ||  || — || November 3, 2004 || Kitt Peak || Spacewatch || — || align=right data-sort-value="0.67" | 670 m || 
|-id=333 bgcolor=#d6d6d6
| 409333 ||  || — || November 4, 2004 || Kitt Peak || Spacewatch || — || align=right | 3.2 km || 
|-id=334 bgcolor=#d6d6d6
| 409334 ||  || — || November 4, 2004 || Kitt Peak || Spacewatch || EOS || align=right | 2.7 km || 
|-id=335 bgcolor=#d6d6d6
| 409335 ||  || — || November 4, 2004 || Kitt Peak || Spacewatch || — || align=right | 2.2 km || 
|-id=336 bgcolor=#d6d6d6
| 409336 ||  || — || October 15, 2004 || Mount Lemmon || Mount Lemmon Survey || — || align=right | 2.9 km || 
|-id=337 bgcolor=#d6d6d6
| 409337 ||  || — || November 5, 2004 || Palomar || NEAT || — || align=right | 2.6 km || 
|-id=338 bgcolor=#d6d6d6
| 409338 ||  || — || November 9, 2004 || Kitt Peak || M. W. Buie || — || align=right | 2.2 km || 
|-id=339 bgcolor=#fefefe
| 409339 ||  || — || November 10, 2004 || Kitt Peak || Spacewatch || — || align=right data-sort-value="0.50" | 500 m || 
|-id=340 bgcolor=#fefefe
| 409340 ||  || — || November 11, 2004 || Kitt Peak || Spacewatch || — || align=right data-sort-value="0.77" | 770 m || 
|-id=341 bgcolor=#fefefe
| 409341 ||  || — || December 10, 2004 || Socorro || LINEAR || — || align=right data-sort-value="0.76" | 760 m || 
|-id=342 bgcolor=#FFC2E0
| 409342 ||  || — || December 12, 2004 || Palomar || NEAT || AMO || align=right data-sort-value="0.38" | 380 m || 
|-id=343 bgcolor=#fefefe
| 409343 ||  || — || December 9, 2004 || Kitt Peak || Spacewatch || — || align=right data-sort-value="0.77" | 770 m || 
|-id=344 bgcolor=#d6d6d6
| 409344 ||  || — || December 10, 2004 || Kitt Peak || Spacewatch || — || align=right | 3.7 km || 
|-id=345 bgcolor=#fefefe
| 409345 ||  || — || December 10, 2004 || Kitt Peak || Spacewatch || — || align=right data-sort-value="0.97" | 970 m || 
|-id=346 bgcolor=#fefefe
| 409346 ||  || — || December 3, 2004 || Kitt Peak || Spacewatch || — || align=right data-sort-value="0.92" | 920 m || 
|-id=347 bgcolor=#fefefe
| 409347 ||  || — || December 11, 2004 || Socorro || LINEAR || — || align=right data-sort-value="0.98" | 980 m || 
|-id=348 bgcolor=#d6d6d6
| 409348 ||  || — || December 11, 2004 || Socorro || LINEAR || — || align=right | 3.7 km || 
|-id=349 bgcolor=#d6d6d6
| 409349 ||  || — || December 11, 2004 || Kitt Peak || Spacewatch || KOR || align=right | 1.5 km || 
|-id=350 bgcolor=#d6d6d6
| 409350 ||  || — || December 11, 2004 || Kitt Peak || Spacewatch || — || align=right | 2.9 km || 
|-id=351 bgcolor=#fefefe
| 409351 ||  || — || December 14, 2004 || Socorro || LINEAR || — || align=right data-sort-value="0.79" | 790 m || 
|-id=352 bgcolor=#fefefe
| 409352 ||  || — || December 12, 2004 || Kitt Peak || Spacewatch || — || align=right data-sort-value="0.62" | 620 m || 
|-id=353 bgcolor=#d6d6d6
| 409353 ||  || — || December 14, 2004 || Socorro || LINEAR || — || align=right | 3.6 km || 
|-id=354 bgcolor=#fefefe
| 409354 ||  || — || December 14, 2004 || Kitt Peak || Spacewatch || — || align=right data-sort-value="0.85" | 850 m || 
|-id=355 bgcolor=#d6d6d6
| 409355 ||  || — || December 2, 2004 || Palomar || NEAT || EOS || align=right | 2.5 km || 
|-id=356 bgcolor=#d6d6d6
| 409356 ||  || — || December 12, 2004 || Kitt Peak || Spacewatch || — || align=right | 2.4 km || 
|-id=357 bgcolor=#fefefe
| 409357 ||  || — || December 18, 2004 || Mount Lemmon || Mount Lemmon Survey || — || align=right data-sort-value="0.96" | 960 m || 
|-id=358 bgcolor=#d6d6d6
| 409358 ||  || — || December 17, 2004 || Haleakala || NEAT || — || align=right | 4.1 km || 
|-id=359 bgcolor=#d6d6d6
| 409359 ||  || — || January 1, 2005 || Catalina || CSS || — || align=right | 2.7 km || 
|-id=360 bgcolor=#fefefe
| 409360 ||  || — || January 1, 2005 || Catalina || CSS || — || align=right | 1.1 km || 
|-id=361 bgcolor=#d6d6d6
| 409361 ||  || — || January 6, 2005 || Socorro || LINEAR || — || align=right | 2.8 km || 
|-id=362 bgcolor=#fefefe
| 409362 ||  || — || January 6, 2005 || Catalina || CSS || H || align=right data-sort-value="0.63" | 630 m || 
|-id=363 bgcolor=#fefefe
| 409363 ||  || — || January 6, 2005 || Socorro || LINEAR || — || align=right | 1.1 km || 
|-id=364 bgcolor=#d6d6d6
| 409364 ||  || — || January 8, 2005 || Socorro || LINEAR || — || align=right | 3.3 km || 
|-id=365 bgcolor=#fefefe
| 409365 ||  || — || January 13, 2005 || Kitt Peak || Spacewatch || — || align=right data-sort-value="0.70" | 700 m || 
|-id=366 bgcolor=#d6d6d6
| 409366 ||  || — || January 15, 2005 || Kitt Peak || Spacewatch || — || align=right | 2.6 km || 
|-id=367 bgcolor=#d6d6d6
| 409367 ||  || — || January 15, 2005 || Socorro || LINEAR || — || align=right | 3.7 km || 
|-id=368 bgcolor=#fefefe
| 409368 ||  || — || January 13, 2005 || Kitt Peak || Spacewatch || NYS || align=right data-sort-value="0.59" | 590 m || 
|-id=369 bgcolor=#fefefe
| 409369 ||  || — || January 15, 2005 || Catalina || CSS || H || align=right data-sort-value="0.82" | 820 m || 
|-id=370 bgcolor=#d6d6d6
| 409370 ||  || — || January 15, 2005 || Kitt Peak || Spacewatch || EOS || align=right | 2.0 km || 
|-id=371 bgcolor=#d6d6d6
| 409371 ||  || — || January 16, 2005 || Socorro || LINEAR || — || align=right | 4.4 km || 
|-id=372 bgcolor=#d6d6d6
| 409372 ||  || — || January 17, 2005 || Kitt Peak || Spacewatch || VER || align=right | 2.6 km || 
|-id=373 bgcolor=#fefefe
| 409373 ||  || — || January 17, 2005 || Catalina || CSS || — || align=right | 1.5 km || 
|-id=374 bgcolor=#d6d6d6
| 409374 ||  || — || December 18, 2004 || Mount Lemmon || Mount Lemmon Survey || TIR || align=right | 3.8 km || 
|-id=375 bgcolor=#fefefe
| 409375 ||  || — || January 16, 2005 || Kitt Peak || Spacewatch || — || align=right data-sort-value="0.78" | 780 m || 
|-id=376 bgcolor=#fefefe
| 409376 ||  || — || January 17, 2005 || Kitt Peak || Spacewatch || — || align=right data-sort-value="0.78" | 780 m || 
|-id=377 bgcolor=#fefefe
| 409377 ||  || — || February 2, 2005 || Catalina || CSS || — || align=right | 1.3 km || 
|-id=378 bgcolor=#fefefe
| 409378 ||  || — || January 13, 2005 || Kitt Peak || Spacewatch || — || align=right | 1.0 km || 
|-id=379 bgcolor=#d6d6d6
| 409379 ||  || — || February 1, 2005 || Kitt Peak || Spacewatch || — || align=right | 3.3 km || 
|-id=380 bgcolor=#fefefe
| 409380 ||  || — || February 1, 2005 || Kitt Peak || Spacewatch || — || align=right data-sort-value="0.79" | 790 m || 
|-id=381 bgcolor=#fefefe
| 409381 ||  || — || February 2, 2005 || Kitt Peak || Spacewatch || V || align=right data-sort-value="0.76" | 760 m || 
|-id=382 bgcolor=#fefefe
| 409382 ||  || — || February 9, 2005 || Kitt Peak || Spacewatch || H || align=right data-sort-value="0.60" | 600 m || 
|-id=383 bgcolor=#fefefe
| 409383 ||  || — || February 17, 2005 || La Silla || A. Boattini, H. Scholl || — || align=right data-sort-value="0.78" | 780 m || 
|-id=384 bgcolor=#fefefe
| 409384 ||  || — || March 1, 2005 || Socorro || LINEAR || — || align=right | 1.2 km || 
|-id=385 bgcolor=#fefefe
| 409385 ||  || — || March 3, 2005 || Kitt Peak || Spacewatch || — || align=right data-sort-value="0.57" | 570 m || 
|-id=386 bgcolor=#fefefe
| 409386 ||  || — || March 5, 2005 || La Silla || R. Gauderon, R. Behrend || — || align=right data-sort-value="0.84" | 840 m || 
|-id=387 bgcolor=#d6d6d6
| 409387 ||  || — || March 3, 2005 || Catalina || CSS || — || align=right | 2.7 km || 
|-id=388 bgcolor=#fefefe
| 409388 ||  || — || March 3, 2005 || Catalina || CSS || — || align=right data-sort-value="0.92" | 920 m || 
|-id=389 bgcolor=#fefefe
| 409389 ||  || — || March 3, 2005 || Catalina || CSS || NYS || align=right data-sort-value="0.70" | 700 m || 
|-id=390 bgcolor=#d6d6d6
| 409390 ||  || — || March 4, 2005 || Kitt Peak || Spacewatch || LIX || align=right | 3.5 km || 
|-id=391 bgcolor=#d6d6d6
| 409391 ||  || — || March 4, 2005 || Mount Lemmon || Mount Lemmon Survey || — || align=right | 2.6 km || 
|-id=392 bgcolor=#fefefe
| 409392 ||  || — || March 3, 2005 || Kitt Peak || Spacewatch || NYS || align=right data-sort-value="0.59" | 590 m || 
|-id=393 bgcolor=#fefefe
| 409393 ||  || — || March 3, 2005 || Catalina || CSS || (5026) || align=right data-sort-value="0.92" | 920 m || 
|-id=394 bgcolor=#fefefe
| 409394 ||  || — || March 4, 2005 || Kitt Peak || Spacewatch || NYS || align=right data-sort-value="0.75" | 750 m || 
|-id=395 bgcolor=#fefefe
| 409395 ||  || — || March 8, 2005 || Kitt Peak || Spacewatch || — || align=right data-sort-value="0.87" | 870 m || 
|-id=396 bgcolor=#E9E9E9
| 409396 ||  || — || March 9, 2005 || Kitt Peak || Spacewatch || — || align=right | 2.6 km || 
|-id=397 bgcolor=#d6d6d6
| 409397 ||  || — || March 8, 2005 || Socorro || LINEAR || TIR || align=right | 3.5 km || 
|-id=398 bgcolor=#fefefe
| 409398 ||  || — || March 13, 2005 || Kitt Peak || Spacewatch || NYS || align=right data-sort-value="0.65" | 650 m || 
|-id=399 bgcolor=#d6d6d6
| 409399 ||  || — || March 13, 2005 || Socorro || LINEAR || EUP || align=right | 4.2 km || 
|-id=400 bgcolor=#fefefe
| 409400 ||  || — || March 12, 2005 || Kitt Peak || Spacewatch || NYS || align=right data-sort-value="0.68" | 680 m || 
|}

409401–409500 

|-bgcolor=#fefefe
| 409401 ||  || — || March 12, 2005 || Socorro || LINEAR || — || align=right data-sort-value="0.85" | 850 m || 
|-id=402 bgcolor=#fefefe
| 409402 ||  || — || March 11, 2005 || Kitt Peak || Spacewatch || NYS || align=right data-sort-value="0.70" | 700 m || 
|-id=403 bgcolor=#fefefe
| 409403 ||  || — || March 8, 2005 || Mount Lemmon || Mount Lemmon Survey || — || align=right data-sort-value="0.88" | 880 m || 
|-id=404 bgcolor=#d6d6d6
| 409404 ||  || — || March 11, 2005 || Kitt Peak || M. W. Buie || THM || align=right | 2.2 km || 
|-id=405 bgcolor=#fefefe
| 409405 ||  || — || April 2, 2005 || Kitt Peak || Spacewatch || — || align=right data-sort-value="0.89" | 890 m || 
|-id=406 bgcolor=#E9E9E9
| 409406 ||  || — || April 5, 2005 || Goodricke-Pigott || R. A. Tucker || — || align=right | 1.0 km || 
|-id=407 bgcolor=#E9E9E9
| 409407 ||  || — || April 6, 2005 || Anderson Mesa || LONEOS || — || align=right | 1.1 km || 
|-id=408 bgcolor=#fefefe
| 409408 ||  || — || April 6, 2005 || Kitt Peak || Spacewatch || — || align=right | 1.0 km || 
|-id=409 bgcolor=#fefefe
| 409409 ||  || — || April 11, 2005 || Mount Lemmon || Mount Lemmon Survey || MAS || align=right data-sort-value="0.71" | 710 m || 
|-id=410 bgcolor=#E9E9E9
| 409410 ||  || — || April 6, 2005 || Mount Lemmon || Mount Lemmon Survey || EUN || align=right | 1.1 km || 
|-id=411 bgcolor=#E9E9E9
| 409411 ||  || — || March 3, 2005 || Kitt Peak || Spacewatch || — || align=right | 1.1 km || 
|-id=412 bgcolor=#fefefe
| 409412 ||  || — || April 10, 2005 || Mount Lemmon || Mount Lemmon Survey || — || align=right data-sort-value="0.70" | 700 m || 
|-id=413 bgcolor=#fefefe
| 409413 ||  || — || April 12, 2005 || Kitt Peak || Spacewatch || H || align=right data-sort-value="0.61" | 610 m || 
|-id=414 bgcolor=#fefefe
| 409414 ||  || — || April 14, 2005 || Kitt Peak || Spacewatch || — || align=right data-sort-value="0.89" | 890 m || 
|-id=415 bgcolor=#d6d6d6
| 409415 ||  || — || April 15, 2005 || Kitt Peak || Spacewatch || EUP || align=right | 4.0 km || 
|-id=416 bgcolor=#fefefe
| 409416 ||  || — || April 4, 2005 || Mount Lemmon || Mount Lemmon Survey || V || align=right data-sort-value="0.57" | 570 m || 
|-id=417 bgcolor=#E9E9E9
| 409417 ||  || — || April 11, 2005 || Kitt Peak || M. W. Buie || — || align=right data-sort-value="0.94" | 940 m || 
|-id=418 bgcolor=#fefefe
| 409418 ||  || — || May 1, 2005 || Palomar || NEAT || H || align=right data-sort-value="0.95" | 950 m || 
|-id=419 bgcolor=#E9E9E9
| 409419 ||  || — || May 8, 2005 || Kitt Peak || Spacewatch || — || align=right | 2.2 km || 
|-id=420 bgcolor=#E9E9E9
| 409420 ||  || — || April 15, 2005 || Catalina || CSS || — || align=right | 1.4 km || 
|-id=421 bgcolor=#fefefe
| 409421 ||  || — || May 8, 2005 || Kitt Peak || Spacewatch || H || align=right data-sort-value="0.78" | 780 m || 
|-id=422 bgcolor=#E9E9E9
| 409422 ||  || — || May 8, 2005 || Kitt Peak || Spacewatch || — || align=right data-sort-value="0.88" | 880 m || 
|-id=423 bgcolor=#E9E9E9
| 409423 ||  || — || May 11, 2005 || Kitt Peak || Spacewatch || — || align=right | 1.0 km || 
|-id=424 bgcolor=#E9E9E9
| 409424 ||  || — || May 14, 2005 || Kitt Peak || Spacewatch || — || align=right data-sort-value="0.82" | 820 m || 
|-id=425 bgcolor=#E9E9E9
| 409425 ||  || — || May 15, 2005 || Mount Lemmon || Mount Lemmon Survey || — || align=right | 1.0 km || 
|-id=426 bgcolor=#E9E9E9
| 409426 ||  || — || June 6, 2005 || Kitt Peak || Spacewatch || — || align=right | 2.0 km || 
|-id=427 bgcolor=#E9E9E9
| 409427 ||  || — || June 9, 2005 || Kitt Peak || Spacewatch || JUN || align=right | 1.2 km || 
|-id=428 bgcolor=#d6d6d6
| 409428 ||  || — || June 13, 2005 || Mount Lemmon || Mount Lemmon Survey || — || align=right | 3.0 km || 
|-id=429 bgcolor=#E9E9E9
| 409429 ||  || — || June 30, 2005 || Kitt Peak || Spacewatch || — || align=right | 1.8 km || 
|-id=430 bgcolor=#E9E9E9
| 409430 ||  || — || June 15, 2005 || Mount Lemmon || Mount Lemmon Survey || — || align=right | 1.2 km || 
|-id=431 bgcolor=#E9E9E9
| 409431 ||  || — || June 28, 2005 || Kitt Peak || Spacewatch || — || align=right | 1.3 km || 
|-id=432 bgcolor=#d6d6d6
| 409432 ||  || — || July 11, 2005 || Kitt Peak || Spacewatch || 3:2 || align=right | 4.9 km || 
|-id=433 bgcolor=#E9E9E9
| 409433 ||  || — || July 5, 2005 || Mount Lemmon || Mount Lemmon Survey || BRU || align=right | 2.2 km || 
|-id=434 bgcolor=#E9E9E9
| 409434 ||  || — || July 8, 2005 || Anderson Mesa || LONEOS || — || align=right | 2.3 km || 
|-id=435 bgcolor=#fefefe
| 409435 ||  || — || December 22, 2003 || Kitt Peak || Spacewatch || — || align=right data-sort-value="0.78" | 780 m || 
|-id=436 bgcolor=#E9E9E9
| 409436 ||  || — || July 28, 2005 || Palomar || NEAT || — || align=right | 1.8 km || 
|-id=437 bgcolor=#E9E9E9
| 409437 ||  || — || March 15, 2004 || Kitt Peak || Spacewatch || EUN || align=right | 1.1 km || 
|-id=438 bgcolor=#E9E9E9
| 409438 ||  || — || July 29, 2005 || Palomar || NEAT || EUN || align=right | 1.6 km || 
|-id=439 bgcolor=#E9E9E9
| 409439 ||  || — || July 28, 2005 || Palomar || NEAT || — || align=right | 1.5 km || 
|-id=440 bgcolor=#E9E9E9
| 409440 ||  || — || July 27, 2005 || Siding Spring || SSS || — || align=right | 2.4 km || 
|-id=441 bgcolor=#E9E9E9
| 409441 ||  || — || August 6, 2005 || Palomar || NEAT || MIS || align=right | 2.8 km || 
|-id=442 bgcolor=#FA8072
| 409442 ||  || — || August 24, 2005 || Siding Spring || SSS || — || align=right | 4.3 km || 
|-id=443 bgcolor=#E9E9E9
| 409443 ||  || — || August 25, 2005 || Palomar || NEAT || — || align=right | 1.7 km || 
|-id=444 bgcolor=#E9E9E9
| 409444 ||  || — || July 9, 2005 || Catalina || CSS || JUN || align=right | 1.3 km || 
|-id=445 bgcolor=#E9E9E9
| 409445 ||  || — || August 25, 2005 || Palomar || NEAT || — || align=right | 1.9 km || 
|-id=446 bgcolor=#E9E9E9
| 409446 ||  || — || August 27, 2005 || Anderson Mesa || LONEOS || ADE || align=right | 1.7 km || 
|-id=447 bgcolor=#E9E9E9
| 409447 ||  || — || June 17, 2005 || Mount Lemmon || Mount Lemmon Survey || — || align=right | 1.8 km || 
|-id=448 bgcolor=#E9E9E9
| 409448 ||  || — || August 27, 2005 || Palomar || NEAT || — || align=right | 1.4 km || 
|-id=449 bgcolor=#E9E9E9
| 409449 ||  || — || August 27, 2005 || Palomar || NEAT || — || align=right | 2.4 km || 
|-id=450 bgcolor=#E9E9E9
| 409450 ||  || — || August 27, 2005 || Palomar || NEAT || — || align=right | 1.9 km || 
|-id=451 bgcolor=#E9E9E9
| 409451 ||  || — || August 28, 2005 || Kitt Peak || Spacewatch || — || align=right | 1.7 km || 
|-id=452 bgcolor=#E9E9E9
| 409452 ||  || — || August 28, 2005 || Kitt Peak || Spacewatch || — || align=right | 2.7 km || 
|-id=453 bgcolor=#E9E9E9
| 409453 ||  || — || August 28, 2005 || Kitt Peak || Spacewatch || — || align=right | 1.3 km || 
|-id=454 bgcolor=#E9E9E9
| 409454 ||  || — || August 28, 2005 || Kitt Peak || Spacewatch || — || align=right | 2.0 km || 
|-id=455 bgcolor=#E9E9E9
| 409455 ||  || — || August 30, 2005 || Kitt Peak || Spacewatch || — || align=right | 2.6 km || 
|-id=456 bgcolor=#E9E9E9
| 409456 ||  || — || August 30, 2005 || Kitt Peak || Spacewatch || — || align=right | 1.8 km || 
|-id=457 bgcolor=#E9E9E9
| 409457 ||  || — || August 31, 2005 || Palomar || NEAT || — || align=right | 1.9 km || 
|-id=458 bgcolor=#E9E9E9
| 409458 ||  || — || August 30, 2005 || Anderson Mesa || LONEOS || — || align=right | 2.8 km || 
|-id=459 bgcolor=#E9E9E9
| 409459 ||  || — || August 31, 2005 || Kitt Peak || Spacewatch || — || align=right | 1.6 km || 
|-id=460 bgcolor=#E9E9E9
| 409460 ||  || — || September 8, 2005 || Socorro || LINEAR || — || align=right | 2.8 km || 
|-id=461 bgcolor=#E9E9E9
| 409461 ||  || — || September 3, 2005 || Catalina || CSS || EUN || align=right | 1.4 km || 
|-id=462 bgcolor=#E9E9E9
| 409462 ||  || — || September 23, 2005 || Kitt Peak || Spacewatch || AEO || align=right | 1.2 km || 
|-id=463 bgcolor=#E9E9E9
| 409463 ||  || — || September 1, 2005 || Kitt Peak || Spacewatch || — || align=right | 2.2 km || 
|-id=464 bgcolor=#E9E9E9
| 409464 ||  || — || August 30, 2005 || Anderson Mesa || LONEOS || GEF || align=right | 1.6 km || 
|-id=465 bgcolor=#E9E9E9
| 409465 ||  || — || September 26, 2005 || Kitt Peak || Spacewatch || — || align=right | 2.3 km || 
|-id=466 bgcolor=#E9E9E9
| 409466 ||  || — || September 23, 2005 || Kitt Peak || Spacewatch || — || align=right | 2.1 km || 
|-id=467 bgcolor=#E9E9E9
| 409467 ||  || — || September 23, 2005 || Kitt Peak || Spacewatch || — || align=right | 1.6 km || 
|-id=468 bgcolor=#E9E9E9
| 409468 ||  || — || September 23, 2005 || Kitt Peak || Spacewatch || DOR || align=right | 2.5 km || 
|-id=469 bgcolor=#E9E9E9
| 409469 ||  || — || September 24, 2005 || Kitt Peak || Spacewatch || — || align=right | 1.5 km || 
|-id=470 bgcolor=#E9E9E9
| 409470 ||  || — || September 24, 2005 || Kitt Peak || Spacewatch || — || align=right | 1.6 km || 
|-id=471 bgcolor=#E9E9E9
| 409471 ||  || — || September 24, 2005 || Kitt Peak || Spacewatch || — || align=right | 1.8 km || 
|-id=472 bgcolor=#E9E9E9
| 409472 ||  || — || September 24, 2005 || Kitt Peak || Spacewatch || — || align=right | 3.2 km || 
|-id=473 bgcolor=#E9E9E9
| 409473 ||  || — || September 25, 2005 || Kitt Peak || Spacewatch || — || align=right | 2.0 km || 
|-id=474 bgcolor=#E9E9E9
| 409474 ||  || — || September 25, 2005 || Kitt Peak || Spacewatch || PAD || align=right | 1.7 km || 
|-id=475 bgcolor=#E9E9E9
| 409475 ||  || — || September 25, 2005 || Kitt Peak || Spacewatch || — || align=right | 2.2 km || 
|-id=476 bgcolor=#E9E9E9
| 409476 ||  || — || September 26, 2005 || Kitt Peak || Spacewatch || — || align=right | 1.6 km || 
|-id=477 bgcolor=#E9E9E9
| 409477 ||  || — || September 26, 2005 || Kitt Peak || Spacewatch || — || align=right | 2.3 km || 
|-id=478 bgcolor=#E9E9E9
| 409478 ||  || — || September 24, 2005 || Kitt Peak || Spacewatch || — || align=right | 2.3 km || 
|-id=479 bgcolor=#E9E9E9
| 409479 ||  || — || September 24, 2005 || Kitt Peak || Spacewatch || — || align=right | 2.0 km || 
|-id=480 bgcolor=#E9E9E9
| 409480 ||  || — || September 24, 2005 || Kitt Peak || Spacewatch || — || align=right | 2.2 km || 
|-id=481 bgcolor=#E9E9E9
| 409481 ||  || — || September 24, 2005 || Kitt Peak || Spacewatch || — || align=right | 1.8 km || 
|-id=482 bgcolor=#E9E9E9
| 409482 ||  || — || September 24, 2005 || Kitt Peak || Spacewatch || — || align=right | 1.8 km || 
|-id=483 bgcolor=#E9E9E9
| 409483 ||  || — || September 24, 2005 || Kitt Peak || Spacewatch || — || align=right | 2.1 km || 
|-id=484 bgcolor=#E9E9E9
| 409484 ||  || — || September 25, 2005 || Kitt Peak || Spacewatch || — || align=right | 2.5 km || 
|-id=485 bgcolor=#E9E9E9
| 409485 ||  || — || September 25, 2005 || Palomar || NEAT || — || align=right | 2.8 km || 
|-id=486 bgcolor=#E9E9E9
| 409486 ||  || — || September 26, 2005 || Catalina || CSS || — || align=right | 3.1 km || 
|-id=487 bgcolor=#E9E9E9
| 409487 ||  || — || September 26, 2005 || Kitt Peak || Spacewatch || — || align=right | 2.3 km || 
|-id=488 bgcolor=#E9E9E9
| 409488 ||  || — || September 26, 2005 || Catalina || CSS || EUN || align=right | 1.6 km || 
|-id=489 bgcolor=#E9E9E9
| 409489 ||  || — || September 26, 2005 || Palomar || NEAT || — || align=right | 2.5 km || 
|-id=490 bgcolor=#E9E9E9
| 409490 ||  || — || August 29, 2005 || Anderson Mesa || LONEOS || — || align=right | 2.2 km || 
|-id=491 bgcolor=#fefefe
| 409491 ||  || — || September 24, 2005 || Kitt Peak || Spacewatch || — || align=right data-sort-value="0.79" | 790 m || 
|-id=492 bgcolor=#E9E9E9
| 409492 ||  || — || September 29, 2005 || Mount Lemmon || Mount Lemmon Survey || — || align=right | 1.5 km || 
|-id=493 bgcolor=#E9E9E9
| 409493 ||  || — || September 25, 2005 || Catalina || CSS || — || align=right | 2.3 km || 
|-id=494 bgcolor=#E9E9E9
| 409494 ||  || — || September 1, 2005 || Kitt Peak || Spacewatch || — || align=right | 2.1 km || 
|-id=495 bgcolor=#E9E9E9
| 409495 ||  || — || September 29, 2005 || Kitt Peak || Spacewatch || — || align=right | 2.1 km || 
|-id=496 bgcolor=#E9E9E9
| 409496 ||  || — || September 24, 2005 || Kitt Peak || Spacewatch || HOF || align=right | 2.9 km || 
|-id=497 bgcolor=#E9E9E9
| 409497 ||  || — || September 29, 2005 || Kitt Peak || Spacewatch || — || align=right | 2.0 km || 
|-id=498 bgcolor=#E9E9E9
| 409498 ||  || — || September 30, 2005 || Mount Lemmon || Mount Lemmon Survey || HOF || align=right | 2.0 km || 
|-id=499 bgcolor=#E9E9E9
| 409499 ||  || — || September 30, 2005 || Mount Lemmon || Mount Lemmon Survey || — || align=right | 2.1 km || 
|-id=500 bgcolor=#E9E9E9
| 409500 ||  || — || September 12, 2005 || Socorro || LINEAR || — || align=right | 2.6 km || 
|}

409501–409600 

|-bgcolor=#E9E9E9
| 409501 ||  || — || September 29, 2005 || Kitt Peak || Spacewatch || — || align=right | 2.3 km || 
|-id=502 bgcolor=#E9E9E9
| 409502 ||  || — || September 29, 2005 || Mount Lemmon || Mount Lemmon Survey || — || align=right | 1.9 km || 
|-id=503 bgcolor=#E9E9E9
| 409503 ||  || — || September 30, 2005 || Kitt Peak || Spacewatch || PAD || align=right | 1.6 km || 
|-id=504 bgcolor=#E9E9E9
| 409504 ||  || — || September 30, 2005 || Kitt Peak || Spacewatch || — || align=right | 2.6 km || 
|-id=505 bgcolor=#E9E9E9
| 409505 ||  || — || September 23, 2005 || Catalina || CSS || — || align=right | 1.4 km || 
|-id=506 bgcolor=#E9E9E9
| 409506 ||  || — || September 23, 2005 || Kitt Peak || Spacewatch || — || align=right | 2.3 km || 
|-id=507 bgcolor=#E9E9E9
| 409507 ||  || — || September 25, 2005 || Kitt Peak || Spacewatch || — || align=right | 1.9 km || 
|-id=508 bgcolor=#E9E9E9
| 409508 ||  || — || September 25, 2005 || Apache Point || A. C. Becker || DOR || align=right | 2.1 km || 
|-id=509 bgcolor=#E9E9E9
| 409509 ||  || — || September 27, 2005 || Kitt Peak || Spacewatch || — || align=right | 1.9 km || 
|-id=510 bgcolor=#E9E9E9
| 409510 ||  || — || September 12, 2005 || Socorro || LINEAR || — || align=right | 3.4 km || 
|-id=511 bgcolor=#E9E9E9
| 409511 ||  || — || October 1, 2005 || Anderson Mesa || LONEOS || — || align=right | 2.0 km || 
|-id=512 bgcolor=#E9E9E9
| 409512 ||  || — || September 1, 2005 || Kitt Peak || Spacewatch || — || align=right | 2.2 km || 
|-id=513 bgcolor=#E9E9E9
| 409513 ||  || — || October 1, 2005 || Mount Lemmon || Mount Lemmon Survey || — || align=right | 2.0 km || 
|-id=514 bgcolor=#E9E9E9
| 409514 ||  || — || October 5, 2005 || Kitt Peak || Spacewatch || NEM || align=right | 2.5 km || 
|-id=515 bgcolor=#E9E9E9
| 409515 ||  || — || October 1, 2005 || Socorro || LINEAR ||  || align=right | 2.4 km || 
|-id=516 bgcolor=#E9E9E9
| 409516 ||  || — || October 1, 2005 || Mount Lemmon || Mount Lemmon Survey || — || align=right | 2.4 km || 
|-id=517 bgcolor=#E9E9E9
| 409517 ||  || — || October 3, 2005 || Kitt Peak || Spacewatch || — || align=right | 1.9 km || 
|-id=518 bgcolor=#E9E9E9
| 409518 ||  || — || October 4, 2005 || Mount Lemmon || Mount Lemmon Survey ||  || align=right | 1.9 km || 
|-id=519 bgcolor=#E9E9E9
| 409519 ||  || — || September 23, 2005 || Anderson Mesa || LONEOS || — || align=right | 2.3 km || 
|-id=520 bgcolor=#E9E9E9
| 409520 ||  || — || October 6, 2005 || Catalina || CSS || — || align=right | 2.0 km || 
|-id=521 bgcolor=#E9E9E9
| 409521 ||  || — || October 3, 2005 || Kitt Peak || Spacewatch || — || align=right | 1.9 km || 
|-id=522 bgcolor=#E9E9E9
| 409522 ||  || — || October 5, 2005 || Mount Lemmon || Mount Lemmon Survey || — || align=right | 2.4 km || 
|-id=523 bgcolor=#E9E9E9
| 409523 ||  || — || September 29, 2005 || Kitt Peak || Spacewatch || — || align=right | 2.5 km || 
|-id=524 bgcolor=#E9E9E9
| 409524 ||  || — || October 7, 2005 || Kitt Peak || Spacewatch || PAD || align=right | 1.7 km || 
|-id=525 bgcolor=#E9E9E9
| 409525 ||  || — || October 7, 2005 || Kitt Peak || Spacewatch || — || align=right | 1.8 km || 
|-id=526 bgcolor=#E9E9E9
| 409526 ||  || — || September 27, 2005 || Kitt Peak || Spacewatch || — || align=right | 1.5 km || 
|-id=527 bgcolor=#E9E9E9
| 409527 ||  || — || October 7, 2005 || Kitt Peak || Spacewatch || — || align=right | 2.0 km || 
|-id=528 bgcolor=#E9E9E9
| 409528 ||  || — || October 7, 2005 || Kitt Peak || Spacewatch || HOF || align=right | 2.4 km || 
|-id=529 bgcolor=#E9E9E9
| 409529 ||  || — || October 7, 2005 || Kitt Peak || Spacewatch || — || align=right | 2.5 km || 
|-id=530 bgcolor=#E9E9E9
| 409530 ||  || — || October 1, 2005 || Socorro || LINEAR || — || align=right | 2.2 km || 
|-id=531 bgcolor=#E9E9E9
| 409531 ||  || — || October 7, 2005 || Catalina || CSS || — || align=right | 2.3 km || 
|-id=532 bgcolor=#E9E9E9
| 409532 ||  || — || October 8, 2005 || Kitt Peak || Spacewatch || — || align=right | 2.2 km || 
|-id=533 bgcolor=#E9E9E9
| 409533 ||  || — || September 29, 2005 || Kitt Peak || Spacewatch || — || align=right | 2.3 km || 
|-id=534 bgcolor=#E9E9E9
| 409534 ||  || — || October 8, 2005 || Kitt Peak || Spacewatch || — || align=right | 2.0 km || 
|-id=535 bgcolor=#E9E9E9
| 409535 ||  || — || October 9, 2005 || Kitt Peak || Spacewatch || WIT || align=right | 1.0 km || 
|-id=536 bgcolor=#E9E9E9
| 409536 ||  || — || October 3, 2005 || Catalina || CSS || — || align=right | 3.2 km || 
|-id=537 bgcolor=#E9E9E9
| 409537 ||  || — || October 1, 2005 || Catalina || CSS || — || align=right | 1.8 km || 
|-id=538 bgcolor=#E9E9E9
| 409538 ||  || — || September 27, 2005 || Kitt Peak || Spacewatch || AGN || align=right | 1.0 km || 
|-id=539 bgcolor=#E9E9E9
| 409539 ||  || — || October 26, 2005 || Socorro || LINEAR || — || align=right | 3.2 km || 
|-id=540 bgcolor=#E9E9E9
| 409540 ||  || — || October 22, 2005 || Kitt Peak || Spacewatch || AGN || align=right | 1.2 km || 
|-id=541 bgcolor=#E9E9E9
| 409541 ||  || — || October 22, 2005 || Kitt Peak || Spacewatch || — || align=right | 2.0 km || 
|-id=542 bgcolor=#E9E9E9
| 409542 ||  || — || October 23, 2005 || Kitt Peak || Spacewatch || — || align=right | 2.8 km || 
|-id=543 bgcolor=#E9E9E9
| 409543 ||  || — || October 24, 2005 || Kitt Peak || Spacewatch || — || align=right | 2.1 km || 
|-id=544 bgcolor=#E9E9E9
| 409544 ||  || — || October 24, 2005 || Kitt Peak || Spacewatch || AGN || align=right | 1.4 km || 
|-id=545 bgcolor=#E9E9E9
| 409545 ||  || — || October 23, 2005 || Catalina || CSS || — || align=right | 2.5 km || 
|-id=546 bgcolor=#E9E9E9
| 409546 ||  || — || October 1, 2005 || Mount Lemmon || Mount Lemmon Survey || — || align=right | 2.6 km || 
|-id=547 bgcolor=#E9E9E9
| 409547 ||  || — || October 1, 2005 || Anderson Mesa || LONEOS || GEF || align=right | 1.5 km || 
|-id=548 bgcolor=#E9E9E9
| 409548 ||  || — || October 23, 2005 || Catalina || CSS || — || align=right | 3.0 km || 
|-id=549 bgcolor=#E9E9E9
| 409549 ||  || — || October 1, 2005 || Socorro || LINEAR || — || align=right | 2.9 km || 
|-id=550 bgcolor=#E9E9E9
| 409550 ||  || — || October 23, 2005 || Catalina || CSS || EUN || align=right | 1.7 km || 
|-id=551 bgcolor=#E9E9E9
| 409551 ||  || — || September 30, 2005 || Kitt Peak || Spacewatch || NEM || align=right | 2.0 km || 
|-id=552 bgcolor=#E9E9E9
| 409552 ||  || — || October 22, 2005 || Kitt Peak || Spacewatch || — || align=right | 2.4 km || 
|-id=553 bgcolor=#E9E9E9
| 409553 ||  || — || October 22, 2005 || Kitt Peak || Spacewatch || MRX || align=right | 1.0 km || 
|-id=554 bgcolor=#E9E9E9
| 409554 ||  || — || October 22, 2005 || Kitt Peak || Spacewatch || — || align=right | 2.1 km || 
|-id=555 bgcolor=#E9E9E9
| 409555 ||  || — || October 22, 2005 || Kitt Peak || Spacewatch || — || align=right | 2.6 km || 
|-id=556 bgcolor=#E9E9E9
| 409556 ||  || — || October 22, 2005 || Kitt Peak || Spacewatch || AEO || align=right | 1.0 km || 
|-id=557 bgcolor=#E9E9E9
| 409557 ||  || — || October 22, 2005 || Kitt Peak || Spacewatch || — || align=right | 2.6 km || 
|-id=558 bgcolor=#E9E9E9
| 409558 ||  || — || October 22, 2005 || Kitt Peak || Spacewatch || MRX || align=right data-sort-value="0.93" | 930 m || 
|-id=559 bgcolor=#E9E9E9
| 409559 ||  || — || October 22, 2005 || Kitt Peak || Spacewatch || MRX || align=right | 1.1 km || 
|-id=560 bgcolor=#d6d6d6
| 409560 ||  || — || October 22, 2005 || Kitt Peak || Spacewatch || — || align=right | 2.0 km || 
|-id=561 bgcolor=#E9E9E9
| 409561 ||  || — || October 22, 2005 || Kitt Peak || Spacewatch || — || align=right | 2.5 km || 
|-id=562 bgcolor=#E9E9E9
| 409562 ||  || — || October 22, 2005 || Palomar || NEAT || — || align=right | 2.1 km || 
|-id=563 bgcolor=#E9E9E9
| 409563 ||  || — || October 23, 2005 || Kitt Peak || Spacewatch || NEM || align=right | 2.4 km || 
|-id=564 bgcolor=#E9E9E9
| 409564 ||  || — || October 24, 2005 || Kitt Peak || Spacewatch || — || align=right | 2.9 km || 
|-id=565 bgcolor=#E9E9E9
| 409565 ||  || — || October 24, 2005 || Kitt Peak || Spacewatch || HOF || align=right | 2.4 km || 
|-id=566 bgcolor=#E9E9E9
| 409566 ||  || — || October 24, 2005 || Kitt Peak || Spacewatch || — || align=right | 2.0 km || 
|-id=567 bgcolor=#E9E9E9
| 409567 ||  || — || October 26, 2005 || Kitt Peak || Spacewatch || HOF || align=right | 2.4 km || 
|-id=568 bgcolor=#E9E9E9
| 409568 ||  || — || October 27, 2005 || Mount Lemmon || Mount Lemmon Survey || — || align=right | 2.3 km || 
|-id=569 bgcolor=#E9E9E9
| 409569 ||  || — || October 9, 2005 || Kitt Peak || Spacewatch || — || align=right | 1.8 km || 
|-id=570 bgcolor=#E9E9E9
| 409570 ||  || — || October 24, 2005 || Kitt Peak || Spacewatch || — || align=right | 2.2 km || 
|-id=571 bgcolor=#d6d6d6
| 409571 ||  || — || October 24, 2005 || Kitt Peak || Spacewatch || — || align=right | 2.5 km || 
|-id=572 bgcolor=#fefefe
| 409572 ||  || — || October 24, 2005 || Kitt Peak || Spacewatch || — || align=right data-sort-value="0.62" | 620 m || 
|-id=573 bgcolor=#d6d6d6
| 409573 ||  || — || October 25, 2005 || Mount Lemmon || Mount Lemmon Survey || KOR || align=right | 1.2 km || 
|-id=574 bgcolor=#E9E9E9
| 409574 ||  || — || October 27, 2005 || Mount Lemmon || Mount Lemmon Survey || — || align=right | 2.1 km || 
|-id=575 bgcolor=#E9E9E9
| 409575 ||  || — || October 25, 2005 || Mount Lemmon || Mount Lemmon Survey || — || align=right | 2.4 km || 
|-id=576 bgcolor=#E9E9E9
| 409576 ||  || — || October 25, 2005 || Kitt Peak || Spacewatch || — || align=right | 1.8 km || 
|-id=577 bgcolor=#E9E9E9
| 409577 ||  || — || October 25, 2005 || Kitt Peak || Spacewatch || EUN || align=right | 1.3 km || 
|-id=578 bgcolor=#E9E9E9
| 409578 ||  || — || October 25, 2005 || Kitt Peak || Spacewatch || — || align=right | 2.7 km || 
|-id=579 bgcolor=#d6d6d6
| 409579 ||  || — || October 27, 2005 || Kitt Peak || Spacewatch || THM || align=right | 2.7 km || 
|-id=580 bgcolor=#E9E9E9
| 409580 ||  || — || October 25, 2005 || Kitt Peak || Spacewatch || — || align=right | 1.8 km || 
|-id=581 bgcolor=#E9E9E9
| 409581 ||  || — || October 26, 2005 || Kitt Peak || Spacewatch || — || align=right | 1.9 km || 
|-id=582 bgcolor=#E9E9E9
| 409582 ||  || — || October 25, 2005 || Kitt Peak || Spacewatch || — || align=right | 3.0 km || 
|-id=583 bgcolor=#E9E9E9
| 409583 ||  || — || October 25, 2005 || Kitt Peak || Spacewatch || — || align=right | 2.7 km || 
|-id=584 bgcolor=#E9E9E9
| 409584 ||  || — || October 25, 2005 || Kitt Peak || Spacewatch || — || align=right | 2.6 km || 
|-id=585 bgcolor=#E9E9E9
| 409585 ||  || — || October 25, 2005 || Kitt Peak || Spacewatch || HOF || align=right | 2.4 km || 
|-id=586 bgcolor=#E9E9E9
| 409586 ||  || — || October 25, 2005 || Kitt Peak || Spacewatch || — || align=right | 3.1 km || 
|-id=587 bgcolor=#E9E9E9
| 409587 ||  || — || October 23, 2005 || Catalina || CSS || — || align=right | 2.9 km || 
|-id=588 bgcolor=#E9E9E9
| 409588 ||  || — || October 28, 2005 || Catalina || CSS || — || align=right | 2.1 km || 
|-id=589 bgcolor=#E9E9E9
| 409589 ||  || — || October 28, 2005 || Catalina || CSS || — || align=right | 3.0 km || 
|-id=590 bgcolor=#E9E9E9
| 409590 ||  || — || October 26, 2005 || Kitt Peak || Spacewatch || — || align=right | 2.5 km || 
|-id=591 bgcolor=#E9E9E9
| 409591 ||  || — || September 20, 1995 || Kitt Peak || Spacewatch || — || align=right | 2.3 km || 
|-id=592 bgcolor=#E9E9E9
| 409592 ||  || — || October 26, 2005 || Kitt Peak || Spacewatch || HOF || align=right | 2.8 km || 
|-id=593 bgcolor=#E9E9E9
| 409593 ||  || — || October 26, 2005 || Kitt Peak || Spacewatch || AGN || align=right | 1.4 km || 
|-id=594 bgcolor=#E9E9E9
| 409594 ||  || — || October 27, 2005 || Mount Lemmon || Mount Lemmon Survey || — || align=right | 2.1 km || 
|-id=595 bgcolor=#E9E9E9
| 409595 ||  || — || October 27, 2005 || Kitt Peak || Spacewatch || — || align=right | 2.1 km || 
|-id=596 bgcolor=#E9E9E9
| 409596 ||  || — || October 12, 2005 || Kitt Peak || Spacewatch || — || align=right | 2.5 km || 
|-id=597 bgcolor=#E9E9E9
| 409597 ||  || — || October 29, 2005 || Catalina || CSS || — || align=right | 3.6 km || 
|-id=598 bgcolor=#E9E9E9
| 409598 ||  || — || October 29, 2005 || Catalina || CSS || — || align=right | 2.2 km || 
|-id=599 bgcolor=#d6d6d6
| 409599 ||  || — || October 27, 2005 || Kitt Peak || Spacewatch || — || align=right | 2.4 km || 
|-id=600 bgcolor=#E9E9E9
| 409600 ||  || — || October 27, 2005 || Kitt Peak || Spacewatch || — || align=right | 1.8 km || 
|}

409601–409700 

|-bgcolor=#E9E9E9
| 409601 ||  || — || October 22, 2005 || Kitt Peak || Spacewatch || — || align=right | 2.4 km || 
|-id=602 bgcolor=#E9E9E9
| 409602 ||  || — || October 27, 2005 || Kitt Peak || Spacewatch || — || align=right | 2.5 km || 
|-id=603 bgcolor=#E9E9E9
| 409603 ||  || — || October 28, 2005 || Mount Lemmon || Mount Lemmon Survey || AST || align=right | 1.6 km || 
|-id=604 bgcolor=#E9E9E9
| 409604 ||  || — || September 24, 2005 || Kitt Peak || Spacewatch ||  || align=right | 2.2 km || 
|-id=605 bgcolor=#E9E9E9
| 409605 ||  || — || October 28, 2005 || Catalina || CSS || — || align=right | 3.0 km || 
|-id=606 bgcolor=#E9E9E9
| 409606 ||  || — || October 5, 2005 || Kitt Peak || Spacewatch || — || align=right | 2.5 km || 
|-id=607 bgcolor=#d6d6d6
| 409607 ||  || — || October 28, 2005 || Kitt Peak || Spacewatch || KOR || align=right | 1.1 km || 
|-id=608 bgcolor=#E9E9E9
| 409608 ||  || — || October 22, 2005 || Catalina || CSS || — || align=right | 2.8 km || 
|-id=609 bgcolor=#E9E9E9
| 409609 ||  || — || October 23, 2005 || Catalina || CSS || EUN || align=right | 1.7 km || 
|-id=610 bgcolor=#E9E9E9
| 409610 ||  || — || October 29, 2005 || Catalina || CSS || — || align=right | 2.9 km || 
|-id=611 bgcolor=#E9E9E9
| 409611 ||  || — || October 25, 2005 || Catalina || CSS || — || align=right | 2.4 km || 
|-id=612 bgcolor=#E9E9E9
| 409612 ||  || — || October 28, 2005 || Kitt Peak || Spacewatch || AST || align=right | 1.5 km || 
|-id=613 bgcolor=#E9E9E9
| 409613 ||  || — || September 30, 2005 || Mount Lemmon || Mount Lemmon Survey || — || align=right | 1.7 km || 
|-id=614 bgcolor=#d6d6d6
| 409614 ||  || — || November 1, 2005 || Kitt Peak || Spacewatch || KOR || align=right | 1.3 km || 
|-id=615 bgcolor=#E9E9E9
| 409615 ||  || — || October 25, 2005 || Kitt Peak || Spacewatch || GEF || align=right | 1.5 km || 
|-id=616 bgcolor=#E9E9E9
| 409616 ||  || — || November 5, 2005 || Kitt Peak || Spacewatch || GEF || align=right | 1.3 km || 
|-id=617 bgcolor=#E9E9E9
| 409617 ||  || — || November 3, 2005 || Catalina || CSS || — || align=right | 2.6 km || 
|-id=618 bgcolor=#E9E9E9
| 409618 ||  || — || November 7, 2005 || Socorro || LINEAR || — || align=right | 2.2 km || 
|-id=619 bgcolor=#E9E9E9
| 409619 ||  || — || October 30, 2005 || Kitt Peak || Spacewatch || AGN || align=right | 1.2 km || 
|-id=620 bgcolor=#E9E9E9
| 409620 ||  || — || October 25, 2005 || Mount Lemmon || Mount Lemmon Survey ||  || align=right | 1.8 km || 
|-id=621 bgcolor=#E9E9E9
| 409621 ||  || — || November 10, 2005 || Catalina || CSS ||  || align=right | 3.0 km || 
|-id=622 bgcolor=#d6d6d6
| 409622 ||  || — || November 21, 2005 || Kitt Peak || Spacewatch || INA || align=right | 3.8 km || 
|-id=623 bgcolor=#d6d6d6
| 409623 ||  || — || November 22, 2005 || Kitt Peak || Spacewatch || KOR || align=right | 1.2 km || 
|-id=624 bgcolor=#d6d6d6
| 409624 ||  || — || November 22, 2005 || Kitt Peak || Spacewatch || KOR || align=right | 1.4 km || 
|-id=625 bgcolor=#d6d6d6
| 409625 ||  || — || November 1, 2005 || Mount Lemmon || Mount Lemmon Survey || — || align=right | 2.7 km || 
|-id=626 bgcolor=#d6d6d6
| 409626 ||  || — || November 3, 2005 || Kitt Peak || Spacewatch || — || align=right | 2.3 km || 
|-id=627 bgcolor=#E9E9E9
| 409627 ||  || — || October 25, 2005 || Mount Lemmon || Mount Lemmon Survey || AGN || align=right | 1.3 km || 
|-id=628 bgcolor=#E9E9E9
| 409628 ||  || — || November 22, 2005 || Kitt Peak || Spacewatch || — || align=right | 1.9 km || 
|-id=629 bgcolor=#d6d6d6
| 409629 ||  || — || November 22, 2005 || Kitt Peak || Spacewatch || KOR || align=right | 1.4 km || 
|-id=630 bgcolor=#E9E9E9
| 409630 ||  || — || November 30, 2005 || Socorro || LINEAR || — || align=right | 2.8 km || 
|-id=631 bgcolor=#E9E9E9
| 409631 ||  || — || October 25, 2005 || Catalina || CSS || DOR || align=right | 2.1 km || 
|-id=632 bgcolor=#d6d6d6
| 409632 ||  || — || October 25, 2005 || Mount Lemmon || Mount Lemmon Survey || — || align=right | 2.1 km || 
|-id=633 bgcolor=#d6d6d6
| 409633 ||  || — || November 30, 2005 || Kitt Peak || Spacewatch || — || align=right | 3.4 km || 
|-id=634 bgcolor=#E9E9E9
| 409634 ||  || — || November 30, 2005 || Mount Lemmon || Mount Lemmon Survey || — || align=right | 2.0 km || 
|-id=635 bgcolor=#d6d6d6
| 409635 ||  || — || November 30, 2005 || Kitt Peak || Spacewatch || NAE || align=right | 2.8 km || 
|-id=636 bgcolor=#E9E9E9
| 409636 ||  || — || November 30, 2005 || Kitt Peak || Spacewatch || — || align=right | 2.0 km || 
|-id=637 bgcolor=#d6d6d6
| 409637 ||  || — || November 28, 2005 || Kitt Peak || Spacewatch || 615 || align=right | 1.7 km || 
|-id=638 bgcolor=#d6d6d6
| 409638 ||  || — || December 4, 2005 || Kitt Peak || Spacewatch || — || align=right | 1.9 km || 
|-id=639 bgcolor=#d6d6d6
| 409639 ||  || — || December 4, 2005 || Kitt Peak || Spacewatch || — || align=right | 2.1 km || 
|-id=640 bgcolor=#d6d6d6
| 409640 ||  || — || December 4, 2005 || Kitt Peak || Spacewatch || — || align=right | 2.4 km || 
|-id=641 bgcolor=#E9E9E9
| 409641 ||  || — || December 2, 2005 || Socorro || LINEAR || — || align=right | 2.8 km || 
|-id=642 bgcolor=#E9E9E9
| 409642 ||  || — || December 5, 2005 || Kitt Peak || Spacewatch || — || align=right | 1.9 km || 
|-id=643 bgcolor=#E9E9E9
| 409643 ||  || — || December 7, 2005 || Kitt Peak || Spacewatch || AGN || align=right | 1.5 km || 
|-id=644 bgcolor=#d6d6d6
| 409644 ||  || — || November 28, 2005 || Kitt Peak || Spacewatch || — || align=right | 2.9 km || 
|-id=645 bgcolor=#d6d6d6
| 409645 ||  || — || December 7, 2005 || Kitt Peak || Spacewatch || — || align=right | 2.3 km || 
|-id=646 bgcolor=#E9E9E9
| 409646 ||  || — || December 4, 2005 || Socorro || LINEAR || — || align=right | 2.4 km || 
|-id=647 bgcolor=#E9E9E9
| 409647 ||  || — || December 21, 2005 || Kitt Peak || Spacewatch || — || align=right | 2.5 km || 
|-id=648 bgcolor=#E9E9E9
| 409648 ||  || — || December 21, 2005 || Kitt Peak || Spacewatch || — || align=right | 2.7 km || 
|-id=649 bgcolor=#d6d6d6
| 409649 ||  || — || December 22, 2005 || Kitt Peak || Spacewatch || EOS || align=right | 2.0 km || 
|-id=650 bgcolor=#d6d6d6
| 409650 ||  || — || December 22, 2005 || Kitt Peak || Spacewatch || — || align=right | 2.3 km || 
|-id=651 bgcolor=#d6d6d6
| 409651 ||  || — || December 24, 2005 || Kitt Peak || Spacewatch || — || align=right | 2.4 km || 
|-id=652 bgcolor=#fefefe
| 409652 ||  || — || December 22, 2005 || Kitt Peak || Spacewatch || — || align=right data-sort-value="0.60" | 600 m || 
|-id=653 bgcolor=#d6d6d6
| 409653 ||  || — || December 25, 2005 || Kitt Peak || Spacewatch || — || align=right | 2.8 km || 
|-id=654 bgcolor=#d6d6d6
| 409654 ||  || — || December 25, 2005 || Kitt Peak || Spacewatch || — || align=right | 2.2 km || 
|-id=655 bgcolor=#d6d6d6
| 409655 ||  || — || December 2, 2005 || Mount Lemmon || Mount Lemmon Survey || EOS || align=right | 1.8 km || 
|-id=656 bgcolor=#d6d6d6
| 409656 ||  || — || December 24, 2005 || Kitt Peak || Spacewatch || — || align=right | 3.0 km || 
|-id=657 bgcolor=#d6d6d6
| 409657 ||  || — || December 25, 2005 || Kitt Peak || Spacewatch || KOR || align=right | 1.5 km || 
|-id=658 bgcolor=#d6d6d6
| 409658 ||  || — || December 25, 2005 || Mount Lemmon || Mount Lemmon Survey || KOR || align=right | 1.1 km || 
|-id=659 bgcolor=#d6d6d6
| 409659 ||  || — || December 25, 2005 || Kitt Peak || Spacewatch || — || align=right | 2.3 km || 
|-id=660 bgcolor=#fefefe
| 409660 ||  || — || December 26, 2005 || Mount Lemmon || Mount Lemmon Survey || MAS || align=right data-sort-value="0.70" | 700 m || 
|-id=661 bgcolor=#d6d6d6
| 409661 ||  || — || December 5, 2005 || Mount Lemmon || Mount Lemmon Survey || — || align=right | 3.3 km || 
|-id=662 bgcolor=#fefefe
| 409662 ||  || — || December 24, 2005 || Kitt Peak || Spacewatch || — || align=right data-sort-value="0.69" | 690 m || 
|-id=663 bgcolor=#d6d6d6
| 409663 ||  || — || December 24, 2005 || Kitt Peak || Spacewatch || — || align=right | 2.3 km || 
|-id=664 bgcolor=#d6d6d6
| 409664 ||  || — || December 26, 2005 || Kitt Peak || Spacewatch || — || align=right | 2.2 km || 
|-id=665 bgcolor=#d6d6d6
| 409665 ||  || — || December 26, 2005 || Kitt Peak || Spacewatch || — || align=right | 2.1 km || 
|-id=666 bgcolor=#fefefe
| 409666 ||  || — || December 26, 2005 || Kitt Peak || Spacewatch || — || align=right data-sort-value="0.54" | 540 m || 
|-id=667 bgcolor=#E9E9E9
| 409667 ||  || — || December 29, 2005 || Socorro || LINEAR || — || align=right | 3.6 km || 
|-id=668 bgcolor=#fefefe
| 409668 ||  || — || December 27, 2005 || Kitt Peak || Spacewatch || — || align=right data-sort-value="0.71" | 710 m || 
|-id=669 bgcolor=#d6d6d6
| 409669 ||  || — || December 4, 2005 || Kitt Peak || Spacewatch || KOR || align=right | 1.3 km || 
|-id=670 bgcolor=#d6d6d6
| 409670 ||  || — || December 28, 2005 || Mount Lemmon || Mount Lemmon Survey || KOR || align=right | 1.2 km || 
|-id=671 bgcolor=#d6d6d6
| 409671 ||  || — || December 28, 2005 || Kitt Peak || Spacewatch || — || align=right | 2.2 km || 
|-id=672 bgcolor=#d6d6d6
| 409672 ||  || — || November 29, 2005 || Mount Lemmon || Mount Lemmon Survey || EOS || align=right | 2.4 km || 
|-id=673 bgcolor=#d6d6d6
| 409673 ||  || — || December 30, 2005 || Mount Lemmon || Mount Lemmon Survey || — || align=right | 2.5 km || 
|-id=674 bgcolor=#d6d6d6
| 409674 ||  || — || October 13, 2005 || Kitt Peak || Spacewatch || — || align=right | 3.1 km || 
|-id=675 bgcolor=#d6d6d6
| 409675 ||  || — || December 30, 2005 || Mount Lemmon || Mount Lemmon Survey || EOS || align=right | 2.6 km || 
|-id=676 bgcolor=#d6d6d6
| 409676 ||  || — || January 5, 2006 || Kitt Peak || Spacewatch || Tj (2.99) || align=right | 5.3 km || 
|-id=677 bgcolor=#d6d6d6
| 409677 ||  || — || January 4, 2006 || Kitt Peak || Spacewatch || — || align=right | 2.3 km || 
|-id=678 bgcolor=#d6d6d6
| 409678 ||  || — || December 10, 2005 || Kitt Peak || Spacewatch || BRA || align=right | 1.2 km || 
|-id=679 bgcolor=#d6d6d6
| 409679 ||  || — || January 4, 2006 || Kitt Peak || Spacewatch || EOS || align=right | 1.9 km || 
|-id=680 bgcolor=#d6d6d6
| 409680 ||  || — || December 27, 2005 || Kitt Peak || Spacewatch || EOS || align=right | 2.2 km || 
|-id=681 bgcolor=#d6d6d6
| 409681 ||  || — || December 22, 2005 || Kitt Peak || Spacewatch || EOS || align=right | 2.3 km || 
|-id=682 bgcolor=#d6d6d6
| 409682 ||  || — || January 4, 2006 || Kitt Peak || Spacewatch || — || align=right | 2.4 km || 
|-id=683 bgcolor=#d6d6d6
| 409683 ||  || — || January 8, 2006 || Mount Lemmon || Mount Lemmon Survey || — || align=right | 3.4 km || 
|-id=684 bgcolor=#E9E9E9
| 409684 ||  || — || November 30, 2005 || Mount Lemmon || Mount Lemmon Survey || — || align=right | 2.5 km || 
|-id=685 bgcolor=#d6d6d6
| 409685 ||  || — || January 5, 2006 || Kitt Peak || Spacewatch || — || align=right | 2.4 km || 
|-id=686 bgcolor=#d6d6d6
| 409686 ||  || — || January 5, 2006 || Kitt Peak || Spacewatch || — || align=right | 1.9 km || 
|-id=687 bgcolor=#d6d6d6
| 409687 ||  || — || December 28, 2005 || Kitt Peak || Spacewatch || — || align=right | 2.7 km || 
|-id=688 bgcolor=#fefefe
| 409688 ||  || — || January 6, 2006 || Kitt Peak || Spacewatch || — || align=right data-sort-value="0.52" | 520 m || 
|-id=689 bgcolor=#d6d6d6
| 409689 ||  || — || October 1, 2005 || Mount Lemmon || Mount Lemmon Survey || — || align=right | 3.5 km || 
|-id=690 bgcolor=#d6d6d6
| 409690 ||  || — || January 6, 2006 || Anderson Mesa || LONEOS || EUP || align=right | 4.9 km || 
|-id=691 bgcolor=#d6d6d6
| 409691 ||  || — || January 8, 2006 || Kitt Peak || Spacewatch || KOR || align=right | 1.4 km || 
|-id=692 bgcolor=#d6d6d6
| 409692 ||  || — || January 7, 2006 || Mount Lemmon || Mount Lemmon Survey || EOS || align=right | 2.2 km || 
|-id=693 bgcolor=#d6d6d6
| 409693 ||  || — || January 22, 2006 || Anderson Mesa || LONEOS || — || align=right | 4.1 km || 
|-id=694 bgcolor=#d6d6d6
| 409694 ||  || — || January 8, 2006 || Kitt Peak || Spacewatch || — || align=right | 2.4 km || 
|-id=695 bgcolor=#fefefe
| 409695 ||  || — || January 22, 2006 || Mount Lemmon || Mount Lemmon Survey || — || align=right data-sort-value="0.69" | 690 m || 
|-id=696 bgcolor=#fefefe
| 409696 ||  || — || January 21, 2006 || Kitt Peak || Spacewatch || — || align=right | 1.1 km || 
|-id=697 bgcolor=#d6d6d6
| 409697 ||  || — || January 6, 2006 || Kitt Peak || Spacewatch || — || align=right | 2.3 km || 
|-id=698 bgcolor=#d6d6d6
| 409698 ||  || — || January 23, 2006 || Mount Lemmon || Mount Lemmon Survey || — || align=right | 3.2 km || 
|-id=699 bgcolor=#d6d6d6
| 409699 ||  || — || January 25, 2006 || Kitt Peak || Spacewatch || — || align=right | 2.1 km || 
|-id=700 bgcolor=#d6d6d6
| 409700 ||  || — || January 23, 2006 || Kitt Peak || Spacewatch || — || align=right | 2.4 km || 
|}

409701–409800 

|-bgcolor=#d6d6d6
| 409701 ||  || — || January 24, 2006 || Saint-Sulpice || B. Christophe || — || align=right | 3.2 km || 
|-id=702 bgcolor=#d6d6d6
| 409702 ||  || — || January 25, 2006 || Kitt Peak || Spacewatch || — || align=right | 2.1 km || 
|-id=703 bgcolor=#d6d6d6
| 409703 ||  || — || January 25, 2006 || Kitt Peak || Spacewatch || — || align=right | 3.2 km || 
|-id=704 bgcolor=#d6d6d6
| 409704 ||  || — || January 25, 2006 || Kitt Peak || Spacewatch || — || align=right | 2.0 km || 
|-id=705 bgcolor=#d6d6d6
| 409705 ||  || — || January 7, 2006 || Mount Lemmon || Mount Lemmon Survey || — || align=right | 2.4 km || 
|-id=706 bgcolor=#fefefe
| 409706 ||  || — || January 26, 2006 || Mount Lemmon || Mount Lemmon Survey || — || align=right data-sort-value="0.69" | 690 m || 
|-id=707 bgcolor=#d6d6d6
| 409707 ||  || — || January 6, 2006 || Mount Lemmon || Mount Lemmon Survey || TIR || align=right | 3.0 km || 
|-id=708 bgcolor=#d6d6d6
| 409708 ||  || — || January 23, 2006 || Catalina || CSS || — || align=right | 3.5 km || 
|-id=709 bgcolor=#d6d6d6
| 409709 ||  || — || January 23, 2006 || Catalina || CSS || — || align=right | 3.7 km || 
|-id=710 bgcolor=#d6d6d6
| 409710 ||  || — || January 26, 2006 || Mount Lemmon || Mount Lemmon Survey || — || align=right | 3.1 km || 
|-id=711 bgcolor=#d6d6d6
| 409711 ||  || — || January 26, 2006 || Mount Lemmon || Mount Lemmon Survey || — || align=right | 2.9 km || 
|-id=712 bgcolor=#d6d6d6
| 409712 ||  || — || January 27, 2006 || Kitt Peak || Spacewatch || EMA || align=right | 4.0 km || 
|-id=713 bgcolor=#d6d6d6
| 409713 ||  || — || January 27, 2006 || Kitt Peak || Spacewatch || — || align=right | 3.1 km || 
|-id=714 bgcolor=#d6d6d6
| 409714 ||  || — || January 10, 2006 || Mount Lemmon || Mount Lemmon Survey || HYG || align=right | 2.7 km || 
|-id=715 bgcolor=#d6d6d6
| 409715 ||  || — || January 30, 2006 || Kitt Peak || Spacewatch || — || align=right | 2.6 km || 
|-id=716 bgcolor=#d6d6d6
| 409716 ||  || — || January 25, 2006 || Kitt Peak || Spacewatch || EOS || align=right | 2.0 km || 
|-id=717 bgcolor=#d6d6d6
| 409717 ||  || — || January 31, 2006 || Kitt Peak || Spacewatch || EOS || align=right | 1.9 km || 
|-id=718 bgcolor=#C2FFFF
| 409718 ||  || — || January 30, 2006 || Kitt Peak || Spacewatch || L5 || align=right | 7.9 km || 
|-id=719 bgcolor=#d6d6d6
| 409719 ||  || — || January 31, 2006 || Kitt Peak || Spacewatch || EOS || align=right | 2.0 km || 
|-id=720 bgcolor=#C2FFFF
| 409720 ||  || — || January 31, 2006 || Kitt Peak || Spacewatch || L5 || align=right | 12 km || 
|-id=721 bgcolor=#d6d6d6
| 409721 ||  || — || January 21, 2006 || Kitt Peak || Spacewatch || — || align=right | 3.8 km || 
|-id=722 bgcolor=#fefefe
| 409722 ||  || — || January 31, 2006 || Kitt Peak || Spacewatch || — || align=right data-sort-value="0.70" | 700 m || 
|-id=723 bgcolor=#d6d6d6
| 409723 ||  || — || January 25, 2006 || Kitt Peak || Spacewatch || — || align=right | 3.1 km || 
|-id=724 bgcolor=#d6d6d6
| 409724 ||  || — || January 31, 2006 || Kitt Peak || Spacewatch || — || align=right | 2.5 km || 
|-id=725 bgcolor=#d6d6d6
| 409725 ||  || — || January 31, 2006 || Kitt Peak || Spacewatch || — || align=right | 2.7 km || 
|-id=726 bgcolor=#fefefe
| 409726 ||  || — || January 23, 2006 || Kitt Peak || Spacewatch || — || align=right data-sort-value="0.69" | 690 m || 
|-id=727 bgcolor=#d6d6d6
| 409727 ||  || — || January 22, 2006 || Mount Lemmon || Mount Lemmon Survey || — || align=right | 2.5 km || 
|-id=728 bgcolor=#d6d6d6
| 409728 ||  || — || February 1, 2006 || Catalina || CSS || URS || align=right | 4.9 km || 
|-id=729 bgcolor=#fefefe
| 409729 ||  || — || February 1, 2006 || Kitt Peak || Spacewatch || — || align=right data-sort-value="0.66" | 660 m || 
|-id=730 bgcolor=#fefefe
| 409730 ||  || — || February 2, 2006 || Kitt Peak || Spacewatch || — || align=right data-sort-value="0.53" | 530 m || 
|-id=731 bgcolor=#d6d6d6
| 409731 ||  || — || February 2, 2006 || Kitt Peak || Spacewatch || VER || align=right | 3.5 km || 
|-id=732 bgcolor=#fefefe
| 409732 ||  || — || January 24, 2006 || Kitt Peak || Spacewatch || — || align=right data-sort-value="0.60" | 600 m || 
|-id=733 bgcolor=#d6d6d6
| 409733 ||  || — || February 2, 2006 || Mount Lemmon || Mount Lemmon Survey || — || align=right | 2.3 km || 
|-id=734 bgcolor=#d6d6d6
| 409734 ||  || — || January 23, 2006 || Kitt Peak || Spacewatch || — || align=right | 2.2 km || 
|-id=735 bgcolor=#d6d6d6
| 409735 ||  || — || January 25, 2006 || Kitt Peak || Spacewatch || — || align=right | 3.1 km || 
|-id=736 bgcolor=#d6d6d6
| 409736 ||  || — || January 22, 2006 || Mount Lemmon || Mount Lemmon Survey || — || align=right | 2.9 km || 
|-id=737 bgcolor=#d6d6d6
| 409737 ||  || — || February 4, 2006 || Kitt Peak || Spacewatch || — || align=right | 3.2 km || 
|-id=738 bgcolor=#fefefe
| 409738 ||  || — || February 4, 2006 || Catalina || CSS || — || align=right | 2.5 km || 
|-id=739 bgcolor=#fefefe
| 409739 ||  || — || February 20, 2006 || Kitt Peak || Spacewatch || — || align=right data-sort-value="0.69" | 690 m || 
|-id=740 bgcolor=#d6d6d6
| 409740 ||  || — || February 1, 2006 || Kitt Peak || Spacewatch || THM || align=right | 2.5 km || 
|-id=741 bgcolor=#fefefe
| 409741 ||  || — || February 20, 2006 || Kitt Peak || Spacewatch || — || align=right data-sort-value="0.76" | 760 m || 
|-id=742 bgcolor=#fefefe
| 409742 ||  || — || February 20, 2006 || Kitt Peak || Spacewatch || — || align=right data-sort-value="0.71" | 710 m || 
|-id=743 bgcolor=#d6d6d6
| 409743 ||  || — || January 26, 2006 || Kitt Peak || Spacewatch || — || align=right | 2.4 km || 
|-id=744 bgcolor=#d6d6d6
| 409744 ||  || — || February 20, 2006 || Kitt Peak || Spacewatch || — || align=right | 3.2 km || 
|-id=745 bgcolor=#d6d6d6
| 409745 ||  || — || February 20, 2006 || Kitt Peak || Spacewatch || — || align=right | 2.7 km || 
|-id=746 bgcolor=#d6d6d6
| 409746 ||  || — || February 20, 2006 || Catalina || CSS || — || align=right | 2.9 km || 
|-id=747 bgcolor=#d6d6d6
| 409747 ||  || — || January 23, 2006 || Mount Lemmon || Mount Lemmon Survey || — || align=right | 2.8 km || 
|-id=748 bgcolor=#fefefe
| 409748 ||  || — || February 24, 2006 || Kitt Peak || Spacewatch || — || align=right data-sort-value="0.66" | 660 m || 
|-id=749 bgcolor=#fefefe
| 409749 ||  || — || February 24, 2006 || Mount Lemmon || Mount Lemmon Survey || — || align=right data-sort-value="0.83" | 830 m || 
|-id=750 bgcolor=#d6d6d6
| 409750 ||  || — || February 22, 2006 || Anderson Mesa || LONEOS || — || align=right | 4.0 km || 
|-id=751 bgcolor=#fefefe
| 409751 ||  || — || January 28, 2006 || Catalina || CSS || PHO || align=right | 1.2 km || 
|-id=752 bgcolor=#d6d6d6
| 409752 ||  || — || November 4, 2005 || Kitt Peak || Spacewatch || — || align=right | 3.1 km || 
|-id=753 bgcolor=#d6d6d6
| 409753 ||  || — || February 4, 2006 || Kitt Peak || Spacewatch || THM || align=right | 2.3 km || 
|-id=754 bgcolor=#d6d6d6
| 409754 ||  || — || February 24, 2006 || Kitt Peak || Spacewatch || — || align=right | 4.1 km || 
|-id=755 bgcolor=#fefefe
| 409755 ||  || — || February 24, 2006 || Kitt Peak || Spacewatch || — || align=right data-sort-value="0.72" | 720 m || 
|-id=756 bgcolor=#d6d6d6
| 409756 ||  || — || February 24, 2006 || Kitt Peak || Spacewatch || — || align=right | 3.8 km || 
|-id=757 bgcolor=#fefefe
| 409757 ||  || — || February 24, 2006 || Kitt Peak || Spacewatch || — || align=right data-sort-value="0.52" | 520 m || 
|-id=758 bgcolor=#d6d6d6
| 409758 ||  || — || February 24, 2006 || Kitt Peak || Spacewatch || — || align=right | 2.5 km || 
|-id=759 bgcolor=#d6d6d6
| 409759 ||  || — || February 24, 2006 || Kitt Peak || Spacewatch || — || align=right | 3.0 km || 
|-id=760 bgcolor=#fefefe
| 409760 ||  || — || February 24, 2006 || Kitt Peak || Spacewatch || — || align=right data-sort-value="0.74" | 740 m || 
|-id=761 bgcolor=#d6d6d6
| 409761 ||  || — || February 24, 2006 || Kitt Peak || Spacewatch || — || align=right | 4.6 km || 
|-id=762 bgcolor=#fefefe
| 409762 ||  || — || February 25, 2006 || Kitt Peak || Spacewatch || — || align=right data-sort-value="0.71" | 710 m || 
|-id=763 bgcolor=#d6d6d6
| 409763 ||  || — || January 23, 2006 || Kitt Peak || Spacewatch || EOS || align=right | 2.1 km || 
|-id=764 bgcolor=#d6d6d6
| 409764 ||  || — || February 25, 2006 || Kitt Peak || Spacewatch || — || align=right | 2.2 km || 
|-id=765 bgcolor=#fefefe
| 409765 ||  || — || February 25, 2006 || Kitt Peak || Spacewatch || — || align=right data-sort-value="0.73" | 730 m || 
|-id=766 bgcolor=#d6d6d6
| 409766 ||  || — || December 10, 2005 || Kitt Peak || Spacewatch || — || align=right | 3.0 km || 
|-id=767 bgcolor=#fefefe
| 409767 ||  || — || February 25, 2006 || Kitt Peak || Spacewatch || — || align=right data-sort-value="0.72" | 720 m || 
|-id=768 bgcolor=#fefefe
| 409768 ||  || — || February 27, 2006 || Kitt Peak || Spacewatch || — || align=right data-sort-value="0.72" | 720 m || 
|-id=769 bgcolor=#d6d6d6
| 409769 ||  || — || February 27, 2006 || Kitt Peak || Spacewatch || EOS || align=right | 2.3 km || 
|-id=770 bgcolor=#d6d6d6
| 409770 ||  || — || February 27, 2006 || Kitt Peak || Spacewatch || — || align=right | 2.3 km || 
|-id=771 bgcolor=#fefefe
| 409771 ||  || — || February 27, 2006 || Mount Lemmon || Mount Lemmon Survey || — || align=right data-sort-value="0.63" | 630 m || 
|-id=772 bgcolor=#fefefe
| 409772 ||  || — || February 27, 2006 || Kitt Peak || Spacewatch || — || align=right data-sort-value="0.62" | 620 m || 
|-id=773 bgcolor=#d6d6d6
| 409773 ||  || — || February 20, 2006 || Kitt Peak || Spacewatch || — || align=right | 2.6 km || 
|-id=774 bgcolor=#d6d6d6
| 409774 ||  || — || March 2, 2006 || Kitt Peak || Spacewatch || — || align=right | 2.2 km || 
|-id=775 bgcolor=#d6d6d6
| 409775 ||  || — || March 2, 2006 || Kitt Peak || Spacewatch || — || align=right | 2.8 km || 
|-id=776 bgcolor=#fefefe
| 409776 ||  || — || March 3, 2006 || Kitt Peak || Spacewatch || — || align=right data-sort-value="0.61" | 610 m || 
|-id=777 bgcolor=#d6d6d6
| 409777 ||  || — || March 3, 2006 || Kitt Peak || Spacewatch || — || align=right | 2.6 km || 
|-id=778 bgcolor=#fefefe
| 409778 ||  || — || March 3, 2006 || Kitt Peak || Spacewatch || — || align=right data-sort-value="0.67" | 670 m || 
|-id=779 bgcolor=#fefefe
| 409779 ||  || — || March 4, 2006 || Kitt Peak || Spacewatch || — || align=right data-sort-value="0.64" | 640 m || 
|-id=780 bgcolor=#d6d6d6
| 409780 ||  || — || March 4, 2006 || Catalina || CSS || — || align=right | 3.6 km || 
|-id=781 bgcolor=#d6d6d6
| 409781 ||  || — || March 4, 2006 || Kitt Peak || Spacewatch || VER || align=right | 2.8 km || 
|-id=782 bgcolor=#d6d6d6
| 409782 ||  || — || March 5, 2006 || Kitt Peak || Spacewatch || — || align=right | 2.5 km || 
|-id=783 bgcolor=#d6d6d6
| 409783 ||  || — || March 5, 2006 || Kitt Peak || Spacewatch || — || align=right | 2.7 km || 
|-id=784 bgcolor=#fefefe
| 409784 ||  || — || March 23, 2006 || Kitt Peak || Spacewatch || — || align=right data-sort-value="0.65" | 650 m || 
|-id=785 bgcolor=#d6d6d6
| 409785 ||  || — || March 23, 2006 || Kitt Peak || Spacewatch || — || align=right | 3.3 km || 
|-id=786 bgcolor=#fefefe
| 409786 ||  || — || March 23, 2006 || Kitt Peak || Spacewatch || — || align=right data-sort-value="0.66" | 660 m || 
|-id=787 bgcolor=#fefefe
| 409787 ||  || — || March 23, 2006 || Kitt Peak || Spacewatch || — || align=right data-sort-value="0.73" | 730 m || 
|-id=788 bgcolor=#d6d6d6
| 409788 ||  || — || March 24, 2006 || Mount Lemmon || Mount Lemmon Survey || — || align=right | 3.2 km || 
|-id=789 bgcolor=#d6d6d6
| 409789 ||  || — || March 25, 2006 || Mount Lemmon || Mount Lemmon Survey || — || align=right | 4.0 km || 
|-id=790 bgcolor=#fefefe
| 409790 ||  || — || March 25, 2006 || Kitt Peak || Spacewatch || NYS || align=right data-sort-value="0.64" | 640 m || 
|-id=791 bgcolor=#d6d6d6
| 409791 ||  || — || March 23, 2006 || Kitt Peak || Spacewatch || — || align=right | 3.1 km || 
|-id=792 bgcolor=#fefefe
| 409792 ||  || — || March 26, 2006 || Kitt Peak || Spacewatch || — || align=right data-sort-value="0.78" | 780 m || 
|-id=793 bgcolor=#d6d6d6
| 409793 ||  || — || March 24, 2006 || Mount Lemmon || Mount Lemmon Survey || — || align=right | 3.4 km || 
|-id=794 bgcolor=#fefefe
| 409794 ||  || — || March 23, 2006 || Kitt Peak || Spacewatch || — || align=right data-sort-value="0.77" | 770 m || 
|-id=795 bgcolor=#d6d6d6
| 409795 ||  || — || April 2, 2006 || Kitt Peak || Spacewatch || — || align=right | 3.5 km || 
|-id=796 bgcolor=#d6d6d6
| 409796 ||  || — || April 7, 2006 || Catalina || CSS || — || align=right | 3.9 km || 
|-id=797 bgcolor=#d6d6d6
| 409797 ||  || — || March 2, 2006 || Kitt Peak || Spacewatch || THM || align=right | 1.9 km || 
|-id=798 bgcolor=#d6d6d6
| 409798 ||  || — || April 2, 2006 || Anderson Mesa || LONEOS || — || align=right | 4.6 km || 
|-id=799 bgcolor=#E9E9E9
| 409799 ||  || — || April 20, 2006 || Kitt Peak || Spacewatch || — || align=right | 1.5 km || 
|-id=800 bgcolor=#FA8072
| 409800 ||  || — || April 23, 2006 || Socorro || LINEAR || — || align=right | 1.2 km || 
|}

409801–409900 

|-bgcolor=#fefefe
| 409801 ||  || — || April 19, 2006 || Mount Lemmon || Mount Lemmon Survey || — || align=right data-sort-value="0.72" | 720 m || 
|-id=802 bgcolor=#fefefe
| 409802 ||  || — || April 24, 2006 || Mount Lemmon || Mount Lemmon Survey || — || align=right data-sort-value="0.63" | 630 m || 
|-id=803 bgcolor=#fefefe
| 409803 ||  || — || April 24, 2006 || Kitt Peak || Spacewatch || — || align=right data-sort-value="0.65" | 650 m || 
|-id=804 bgcolor=#fefefe
| 409804 ||  || — || April 26, 2006 || Kitt Peak || Spacewatch || — || align=right data-sort-value="0.76" | 760 m || 
|-id=805 bgcolor=#fefefe
| 409805 ||  || — || April 19, 2006 || Catalina || CSS || V || align=right data-sort-value="0.87" | 870 m || 
|-id=806 bgcolor=#fefefe
| 409806 ||  || — || April 24, 2006 || Kitt Peak || Spacewatch || V || align=right data-sort-value="0.62" | 620 m || 
|-id=807 bgcolor=#fefefe
| 409807 ||  || — || March 24, 2006 || Mount Lemmon || Mount Lemmon Survey || — || align=right data-sort-value="0.69" | 690 m || 
|-id=808 bgcolor=#fefefe
| 409808 ||  || — || April 26, 2006 || Kitt Peak || Spacewatch || — || align=right data-sort-value="0.67" | 670 m || 
|-id=809 bgcolor=#fefefe
| 409809 ||  || — || April 26, 2006 || Kitt Peak || Spacewatch || — || align=right data-sort-value="0.71" | 710 m || 
|-id=810 bgcolor=#fefefe
| 409810 ||  || — || April 25, 2006 || Kitt Peak || Spacewatch || — || align=right | 1.0 km || 
|-id=811 bgcolor=#d6d6d6
| 409811 ||  || — || April 30, 2006 || Kitt Peak || Spacewatch || — || align=right | 3.8 km || 
|-id=812 bgcolor=#d6d6d6
| 409812 ||  || — || April 30, 2006 || Kitt Peak || Spacewatch || — || align=right | 3.0 km || 
|-id=813 bgcolor=#d6d6d6
| 409813 ||  || — || April 26, 2006 || Cerro Tololo || M. W. Buie || — || align=right | 3.2 km || 
|-id=814 bgcolor=#d6d6d6
| 409814 ||  || — || May 1, 2006 || Kitt Peak || Spacewatch || — || align=right | 3.3 km || 
|-id=815 bgcolor=#d6d6d6
| 409815 ||  || — || May 2, 2006 || Mount Lemmon || Mount Lemmon Survey || — || align=right | 3.0 km || 
|-id=816 bgcolor=#fefefe
| 409816 ||  || — || May 2, 2006 || Mount Lemmon || Mount Lemmon Survey || — || align=right data-sort-value="0.64" | 640 m || 
|-id=817 bgcolor=#fefefe
| 409817 ||  || — || May 2, 2006 || Kitt Peak || Spacewatch || V || align=right data-sort-value="0.62" | 620 m || 
|-id=818 bgcolor=#fefefe
| 409818 ||  || — || May 4, 2006 || Kitt Peak || Spacewatch || — || align=right | 1.7 km || 
|-id=819 bgcolor=#d6d6d6
| 409819 ||  || — || May 1, 2006 || Kitt Peak || M. W. Buie || THM || align=right | 2.7 km || 
|-id=820 bgcolor=#fefefe
| 409820 ||  || — || May 19, 2006 || Mount Lemmon || Mount Lemmon Survey || — || align=right data-sort-value="0.67" | 670 m || 
|-id=821 bgcolor=#d6d6d6
| 409821 ||  || — || January 16, 2005 || Kitt Peak || Spacewatch || EOS || align=right | 2.1 km || 
|-id=822 bgcolor=#fefefe
| 409822 ||  || — || May 20, 2006 || Kitt Peak || Spacewatch || — || align=right data-sort-value="0.67" | 670 m || 
|-id=823 bgcolor=#d6d6d6
| 409823 ||  || — || May 22, 2006 || Kitt Peak || Spacewatch || — || align=right | 4.2 km || 
|-id=824 bgcolor=#d6d6d6
| 409824 ||  || — || May 7, 2006 || Mount Lemmon || Mount Lemmon Survey || — || align=right | 3.1 km || 
|-id=825 bgcolor=#d6d6d6
| 409825 ||  || — || May 22, 2006 || Kitt Peak || Spacewatch || THB || align=right | 3.0 km || 
|-id=826 bgcolor=#fefefe
| 409826 ||  || — || May 20, 2006 || Kitt Peak || Spacewatch || — || align=right data-sort-value="0.74" | 740 m || 
|-id=827 bgcolor=#fefefe
| 409827 ||  || — || May 21, 2006 || Kitt Peak || Spacewatch || H || align=right data-sort-value="0.52" | 520 m || 
|-id=828 bgcolor=#d6d6d6
| 409828 ||  || — || June 1, 2006 || Kitt Peak || Spacewatch || LUT || align=right | 5.4 km || 
|-id=829 bgcolor=#FA8072
| 409829 ||  || — || July 31, 2006 || Siding Spring || SSS || — || align=right data-sort-value="0.85" | 850 m || 
|-id=830 bgcolor=#fefefe
| 409830 ||  || — || July 31, 2006 || Siding Spring || SSS || — || align=right data-sort-value="0.91" | 910 m || 
|-id=831 bgcolor=#fefefe
| 409831 ||  || — || August 16, 2006 || Lulin Observatory || C.-S. Lin, Q.-z. Ye || H || align=right data-sort-value="0.85" | 850 m || 
|-id=832 bgcolor=#d6d6d6
| 409832 ||  || — || August 21, 2006 || Kitt Peak || Spacewatch || 3:2 || align=right | 6.2 km || 
|-id=833 bgcolor=#fefefe
| 409833 ||  || — || August 21, 2006 || Kitt Peak || Spacewatch || NYS || align=right data-sort-value="0.82" | 820 m || 
|-id=834 bgcolor=#fefefe
| 409834 ||  || — || March 12, 2005 || Mount Lemmon || Mount Lemmon Survey || — || align=right | 1.0 km || 
|-id=835 bgcolor=#E9E9E9
| 409835 ||  || — || August 27, 2006 || Kitt Peak || Spacewatch || — || align=right data-sort-value="0.68" | 680 m || 
|-id=836 bgcolor=#FFC2E0
| 409836 ||  || — || August 30, 2006 || Socorro || LINEAR || APO +1kmPHA || align=right data-sort-value="0.55" | 550 m || 
|-id=837 bgcolor=#fefefe
| 409837 ||  || — || July 18, 2006 || Mount Lemmon || Mount Lemmon Survey || — || align=right data-sort-value="0.95" | 950 m || 
|-id=838 bgcolor=#fefefe
| 409838 ||  || — || August 16, 2006 || Palomar || NEAT || — || align=right data-sort-value="0.80" | 800 m || 
|-id=839 bgcolor=#fefefe
| 409839 ||  || — || August 30, 2006 || Anderson Mesa || LONEOS || — || align=right data-sort-value="0.91" | 910 m || 
|-id=840 bgcolor=#fefefe
| 409840 ||  || — || August 19, 2006 || Kitt Peak || Spacewatch || — || align=right data-sort-value="0.71" | 710 m || 
|-id=841 bgcolor=#d6d6d6
| 409841 ||  || — || September 13, 2006 || Palomar || NEAT || 3:2 || align=right | 5.1 km || 
|-id=842 bgcolor=#E9E9E9
| 409842 ||  || — || September 14, 2006 || Kitt Peak || Spacewatch || — || align=right | 1.5 km || 
|-id=843 bgcolor=#E9E9E9
| 409843 ||  || — || September 14, 2006 || Kitt Peak || Spacewatch || KON || align=right | 2.1 km || 
|-id=844 bgcolor=#E9E9E9
| 409844 ||  || — || September 15, 2006 || Kitt Peak || Spacewatch || — || align=right | 1.0 km || 
|-id=845 bgcolor=#fefefe
| 409845 ||  || — || September 17, 2006 || Kitt Peak || Spacewatch || — || align=right data-sort-value="0.99" | 990 m || 
|-id=846 bgcolor=#E9E9E9
| 409846 ||  || — || August 28, 2006 || Anderson Mesa || LONEOS || JUN || align=right | 1.2 km || 
|-id=847 bgcolor=#d6d6d6
| 409847 ||  || — || September 19, 2006 || Kitt Peak || Spacewatch || 3:2 || align=right | 4.4 km || 
|-id=848 bgcolor=#E9E9E9
| 409848 ||  || — || September 19, 2006 || Kitt Peak || Spacewatch || — || align=right data-sort-value="0.90" | 900 m || 
|-id=849 bgcolor=#E9E9E9
| 409849 ||  || — || September 17, 2006 || Kitt Peak || Spacewatch || — || align=right data-sort-value="0.91" | 910 m || 
|-id=850 bgcolor=#fefefe
| 409850 ||  || — || September 18, 2006 || Kitt Peak || Spacewatch || H || align=right data-sort-value="0.64" | 640 m || 
|-id=851 bgcolor=#fefefe
| 409851 ||  || — || September 18, 2006 || Kitt Peak || Spacewatch || — || align=right data-sort-value="0.81" | 810 m || 
|-id=852 bgcolor=#E9E9E9
| 409852 ||  || — || September 18, 2006 || Kitt Peak || Spacewatch || EUN || align=right | 1.2 km || 
|-id=853 bgcolor=#fefefe
| 409853 ||  || — || September 18, 2006 || Catalina || CSS || H || align=right data-sort-value="0.63" | 630 m || 
|-id=854 bgcolor=#d6d6d6
| 409854 ||  || — || September 18, 2006 || Catalina || CSS || 3:2 || align=right | 4.8 km || 
|-id=855 bgcolor=#fefefe
| 409855 ||  || — || September 19, 2006 || Catalina || CSS || H || align=right data-sort-value="0.80" | 800 m || 
|-id=856 bgcolor=#d6d6d6
| 409856 ||  || — || September 19, 2006 || Catalina || CSS || 3:2 || align=right | 4.9 km || 
|-id=857 bgcolor=#fefefe
| 409857 ||  || — || September 19, 2006 || Catalina || CSS || H || align=right data-sort-value="0.58" | 580 m || 
|-id=858 bgcolor=#fefefe
| 409858 ||  || — || September 18, 2006 || Anderson Mesa || LONEOS || H || align=right data-sort-value="0.62" | 620 m || 
|-id=859 bgcolor=#E9E9E9
| 409859 ||  || — || September 24, 2006 || Calvin-Rehoboth || L. A. Molnar || — || align=right data-sort-value="0.71" | 710 m || 
|-id=860 bgcolor=#E9E9E9
| 409860 ||  || — || September 20, 2006 || Palomar || NEAT || — || align=right | 1.2 km || 
|-id=861 bgcolor=#E9E9E9
| 409861 ||  || — || September 19, 2006 || Kitt Peak || Spacewatch || — || align=right data-sort-value="0.99" | 990 m || 
|-id=862 bgcolor=#fefefe
| 409862 ||  || — || September 14, 2006 || Kitt Peak || Spacewatch || — || align=right data-sort-value="0.78" | 780 m || 
|-id=863 bgcolor=#E9E9E9
| 409863 ||  || — || September 25, 2006 || Mount Lemmon || Mount Lemmon Survey || — || align=right | 1.5 km || 
|-id=864 bgcolor=#E9E9E9
| 409864 ||  || — || September 26, 2006 || Kitt Peak || Spacewatch || — || align=right data-sort-value="0.52" | 520 m || 
|-id=865 bgcolor=#fefefe
| 409865 ||  || — || September 26, 2006 || Kitt Peak || Spacewatch || H || align=right data-sort-value="0.67" | 670 m || 
|-id=866 bgcolor=#E9E9E9
| 409866 ||  || — || September 18, 2006 || Catalina || CSS || — || align=right | 1.5 km || 
|-id=867 bgcolor=#E9E9E9
| 409867 ||  || — || September 25, 2006 || Kitt Peak || Spacewatch || — || align=right | 1.0 km || 
|-id=868 bgcolor=#E9E9E9
| 409868 ||  || — || September 25, 2006 || Mount Lemmon || Mount Lemmon Survey || — || align=right data-sort-value="0.86" | 860 m || 
|-id=869 bgcolor=#fefefe
| 409869 ||  || — || September 26, 2006 || Kitt Peak || Spacewatch || — || align=right data-sort-value="0.84" | 840 m || 
|-id=870 bgcolor=#E9E9E9
| 409870 ||  || — || September 26, 2006 || Catalina || CSS || — || align=right | 1.00 km || 
|-id=871 bgcolor=#E9E9E9
| 409871 ||  || — || September 26, 2006 || Mount Lemmon || Mount Lemmon Survey || ADE || align=right | 1.7 km || 
|-id=872 bgcolor=#d6d6d6
| 409872 ||  || — || September 26, 2006 || Mount Lemmon || Mount Lemmon Survey || 3:2 || align=right | 4.0 km || 
|-id=873 bgcolor=#E9E9E9
| 409873 ||  || — || September 26, 2006 || Kitt Peak || Spacewatch || — || align=right data-sort-value="0.78" | 780 m || 
|-id=874 bgcolor=#E9E9E9
| 409874 ||  || — || September 26, 2006 || Kitt Peak || Spacewatch || MAR || align=right | 1.0 km || 
|-id=875 bgcolor=#fefefe
| 409875 ||  || — || September 27, 2006 || Anderson Mesa || LONEOS || H || align=right data-sort-value="0.50" | 500 m || 
|-id=876 bgcolor=#E9E9E9
| 409876 ||  || — || September 19, 2006 || Catalina || CSS || — || align=right data-sort-value="0.75" | 750 m || 
|-id=877 bgcolor=#fefefe
| 409877 ||  || — || September 29, 2006 || Anderson Mesa || LONEOS || H || align=right data-sort-value="0.53" | 530 m || 
|-id=878 bgcolor=#E9E9E9
| 409878 ||  || — || September 17, 2006 || Kitt Peak || Spacewatch || — || align=right | 1.2 km || 
|-id=879 bgcolor=#E9E9E9
| 409879 ||  || — || September 17, 2006 || Kitt Peak || Spacewatch || — || align=right data-sort-value="0.68" | 680 m || 
|-id=880 bgcolor=#d6d6d6
| 409880 ||  || — || September 26, 2006 || Mount Lemmon || Mount Lemmon Survey || SHU3:2 || align=right | 6.6 km || 
|-id=881 bgcolor=#E9E9E9
| 409881 ||  || — || September 27, 2006 || Kitt Peak || Spacewatch || — || align=right data-sort-value="0.98" | 980 m || 
|-id=882 bgcolor=#d6d6d6
| 409882 ||  || — || September 28, 2006 || Kitt Peak || Spacewatch || 3:2 || align=right | 5.5 km || 
|-id=883 bgcolor=#FA8072
| 409883 ||  || — || September 28, 2006 || Catalina || CSS || H || align=right data-sort-value="0.93" | 930 m || 
|-id=884 bgcolor=#d6d6d6
| 409884 ||  || — || September 30, 2006 || Mount Lemmon || Mount Lemmon Survey || — || align=right | 3.5 km || 
|-id=885 bgcolor=#fefefe
| 409885 ||  || — || September 30, 2006 || Catalina || CSS || H || align=right data-sort-value="0.61" | 610 m || 
|-id=886 bgcolor=#E9E9E9
| 409886 ||  || — || September 28, 2006 || Mount Lemmon || Mount Lemmon Survey || — || align=right | 1.0 km || 
|-id=887 bgcolor=#E9E9E9
| 409887 ||  || — || September 28, 2006 || Mount Lemmon || Mount Lemmon Survey || (5) || align=right | 1.1 km || 
|-id=888 bgcolor=#E9E9E9
| 409888 ||  || — || September 30, 2006 || Mount Lemmon || Mount Lemmon Survey || — || align=right | 1.6 km || 
|-id=889 bgcolor=#E9E9E9
| 409889 ||  || — || September 30, 2006 || Catalina || CSS || — || align=right | 1.1 km || 
|-id=890 bgcolor=#E9E9E9
| 409890 ||  || — || September 30, 2006 || Mount Lemmon || Mount Lemmon Survey || ADE || align=right | 2.0 km || 
|-id=891 bgcolor=#E9E9E9
| 409891 ||  || — || September 30, 2006 || Mount Lemmon || Mount Lemmon Survey || — || align=right | 1.0 km || 
|-id=892 bgcolor=#E9E9E9
| 409892 ||  || — || September 26, 2006 || Mount Lemmon || Mount Lemmon Survey || — || align=right | 1.3 km || 
|-id=893 bgcolor=#E9E9E9
| 409893 ||  || — || September 27, 2006 || Mount Lemmon || Mount Lemmon Survey || EUN || align=right | 1.2 km || 
|-id=894 bgcolor=#E9E9E9
| 409894 ||  || — || September 28, 2006 || Mount Lemmon || Mount Lemmon Survey || — || align=right data-sort-value="0.86" | 860 m || 
|-id=895 bgcolor=#E9E9E9
| 409895 ||  || — || September 30, 2006 || Mount Lemmon || Mount Lemmon Survey || — || align=right | 1.9 km || 
|-id=896 bgcolor=#d6d6d6
| 409896 ||  || — || September 28, 2006 || Mount Lemmon || Mount Lemmon Survey || — || align=right | 4.0 km || 
|-id=897 bgcolor=#E9E9E9
| 409897 ||  || — || September 25, 2006 || Mount Lemmon || Mount Lemmon Survey || EUN || align=right | 1.2 km || 
|-id=898 bgcolor=#fefefe
| 409898 ||  || — || September 27, 2006 || Mount Lemmon || Mount Lemmon Survey || H || align=right data-sort-value="0.85" | 850 m || 
|-id=899 bgcolor=#E9E9E9
| 409899 ||  || — || September 30, 2006 || Catalina || CSS || — || align=right | 1.5 km || 
|-id=900 bgcolor=#E9E9E9
| 409900 ||  || — || October 3, 2006 || Mount Lemmon || Mount Lemmon Survey || — || align=right data-sort-value="0.78" | 780 m || 
|}

409901–410000 

|-bgcolor=#E9E9E9
| 409901 ||  || — || October 4, 2006 || Mount Lemmon || Mount Lemmon Survey || — || align=right data-sort-value="0.82" | 820 m || 
|-id=902 bgcolor=#E9E9E9
| 409902 ||  || — || October 15, 2006 || Piszkéstető || K. Sárneczky, Z. Kuli || — || align=right data-sort-value="0.89" | 890 m || 
|-id=903 bgcolor=#fefefe
| 409903 ||  || — || September 17, 2006 || Kitt Peak || Spacewatch || H || align=right data-sort-value="0.75" | 750 m || 
|-id=904 bgcolor=#E9E9E9
| 409904 ||  || — || October 12, 2006 || Kitt Peak || Spacewatch || — || align=right data-sort-value="0.73" | 730 m || 
|-id=905 bgcolor=#E9E9E9
| 409905 ||  || — || October 12, 2006 || Kitt Peak || Spacewatch || (5) || align=right data-sort-value="0.66" | 660 m || 
|-id=906 bgcolor=#E9E9E9
| 409906 ||  || — || October 12, 2006 || Kitt Peak || Spacewatch || — || align=right data-sort-value="0.57" | 570 m || 
|-id=907 bgcolor=#E9E9E9
| 409907 ||  || — || October 3, 2006 || Mount Lemmon || Mount Lemmon Survey || (5) || align=right data-sort-value="0.71" | 710 m || 
|-id=908 bgcolor=#E9E9E9
| 409908 ||  || — || October 12, 2006 || Kitt Peak || Spacewatch || — || align=right | 2.9 km || 
|-id=909 bgcolor=#E9E9E9
| 409909 ||  || — || October 12, 2006 || Palomar || NEAT || (5) || align=right data-sort-value="0.65" | 650 m || 
|-id=910 bgcolor=#E9E9E9
| 409910 ||  || — || October 12, 2006 || Kitt Peak || Spacewatch || — || align=right | 1.3 km || 
|-id=911 bgcolor=#E9E9E9
| 409911 ||  || — || October 12, 2006 || Kitt Peak || Spacewatch || — || align=right | 1.8 km || 
|-id=912 bgcolor=#E9E9E9
| 409912 ||  || — || September 28, 2006 || Mount Lemmon || Mount Lemmon Survey || — || align=right data-sort-value="0.74" | 740 m || 
|-id=913 bgcolor=#E9E9E9
| 409913 ||  || — || October 12, 2006 || Kitt Peak || Spacewatch || — || align=right data-sort-value="0.86" | 860 m || 
|-id=914 bgcolor=#E9E9E9
| 409914 ||  || — || October 11, 2006 || Palomar || NEAT || — || align=right | 1.3 km || 
|-id=915 bgcolor=#E9E9E9
| 409915 ||  || — || October 11, 2006 || Palomar || NEAT || — || align=right data-sort-value="0.91" | 910 m || 
|-id=916 bgcolor=#E9E9E9
| 409916 ||  || — || October 13, 2006 || Kitt Peak || Spacewatch || — || align=right | 1.6 km || 
|-id=917 bgcolor=#E9E9E9
| 409917 ||  || — || October 13, 2006 || Kitt Peak || Spacewatch || — || align=right data-sort-value="0.59" | 590 m || 
|-id=918 bgcolor=#E9E9E9
| 409918 ||  || — || October 13, 2006 || Kitt Peak || Spacewatch || — || align=right data-sort-value="0.89" | 890 m || 
|-id=919 bgcolor=#E9E9E9
| 409919 ||  || — || September 30, 2006 || Mount Lemmon || Mount Lemmon Survey || (5) || align=right data-sort-value="0.77" | 770 m || 
|-id=920 bgcolor=#E9E9E9
| 409920 ||  || — || October 13, 2006 || Kitt Peak || Spacewatch || — || align=right | 1.3 km || 
|-id=921 bgcolor=#d6d6d6
| 409921 ||  || — || October 15, 2006 || Catalina || CSS || 3:2 || align=right | 4.3 km || 
|-id=922 bgcolor=#E9E9E9
| 409922 ||  || — || October 12, 2006 || Kitt Peak || Spacewatch || — || align=right data-sort-value="0.91" | 910 m || 
|-id=923 bgcolor=#E9E9E9
| 409923 ||  || — || October 15, 2006 || Kitt Peak || Spacewatch || — || align=right data-sort-value="0.75" | 750 m || 
|-id=924 bgcolor=#E9E9E9
| 409924 ||  || — || October 2, 2006 || Apache Point || A. C. Becker || — || align=right | 1.0 km || 
|-id=925 bgcolor=#E9E9E9
| 409925 ||  || — || October 2, 2006 || Mount Lemmon || Mount Lemmon Survey || — || align=right data-sort-value="0.94" | 940 m || 
|-id=926 bgcolor=#E9E9E9
| 409926 ||  || — || October 16, 2006 || Catalina || CSS || — || align=right | 1.3 km || 
|-id=927 bgcolor=#E9E9E9
| 409927 ||  || — || October 16, 2006 || Catalina || CSS || — || align=right | 1.0 km || 
|-id=928 bgcolor=#E9E9E9
| 409928 ||  || — || October 16, 2006 || Kitt Peak || Spacewatch || — || align=right data-sort-value="0.82" | 820 m || 
|-id=929 bgcolor=#E9E9E9
| 409929 ||  || — || September 25, 2006 || Kitt Peak || Spacewatch || — || align=right data-sort-value="0.98" | 980 m || 
|-id=930 bgcolor=#E9E9E9
| 409930 ||  || — || October 16, 2006 || Kitt Peak || Spacewatch || — || align=right | 1.2 km || 
|-id=931 bgcolor=#E9E9E9
| 409931 ||  || — || October 16, 2006 || Kitt Peak || Spacewatch || — || align=right | 1.3 km || 
|-id=932 bgcolor=#E9E9E9
| 409932 ||  || — || October 17, 2006 || Mount Lemmon || Mount Lemmon Survey || — || align=right | 1.1 km || 
|-id=933 bgcolor=#E9E9E9
| 409933 ||  || — || September 28, 2006 || Mount Lemmon || Mount Lemmon Survey || — || align=right data-sort-value="0.81" | 810 m || 
|-id=934 bgcolor=#FFC2E0
| 409934 ||  || — || October 23, 2006 || Siding Spring || SSS || AMO || align=right data-sort-value="0.74" | 740 m || 
|-id=935 bgcolor=#d6d6d6
| 409935 ||  || — || October 23, 2006 || Kitami || K. Endate || 3:2 || align=right | 5.0 km || 
|-id=936 bgcolor=#E9E9E9
| 409936 ||  || — || October 16, 2006 || Catalina || CSS || — || align=right data-sort-value="0.71" | 710 m || 
|-id=937 bgcolor=#E9E9E9
| 409937 ||  || — || October 16, 2006 || Catalina || CSS || — || align=right | 3.1 km || 
|-id=938 bgcolor=#E9E9E9
| 409938 ||  || — || October 17, 2006 || Kitt Peak || Spacewatch || — || align=right data-sort-value="0.69" | 690 m || 
|-id=939 bgcolor=#E9E9E9
| 409939 ||  || — || October 17, 2006 || Kitt Peak || Spacewatch || (5) || align=right data-sort-value="0.71" | 710 m || 
|-id=940 bgcolor=#E9E9E9
| 409940 ||  || — || September 30, 2006 || Mount Lemmon || Mount Lemmon Survey || — || align=right data-sort-value="0.71" | 710 m || 
|-id=941 bgcolor=#E9E9E9
| 409941 ||  || — || October 18, 2006 || Kitt Peak || Spacewatch || — || align=right data-sort-value="0.91" | 910 m || 
|-id=942 bgcolor=#E9E9E9
| 409942 ||  || — || September 14, 2006 || Kitt Peak || Spacewatch || — || align=right data-sort-value="0.71" | 710 m || 
|-id=943 bgcolor=#d6d6d6
| 409943 ||  || — || October 19, 2006 || Kitt Peak || Spacewatch || SHU3:2 || align=right | 5.0 km || 
|-id=944 bgcolor=#E9E9E9
| 409944 ||  || — || October 19, 2006 || Mount Lemmon || Mount Lemmon Survey || — || align=right | 1.3 km || 
|-id=945 bgcolor=#E9E9E9
| 409945 ||  || — || October 20, 2006 || Mount Lemmon || Mount Lemmon Survey || — || align=right | 1.5 km || 
|-id=946 bgcolor=#E9E9E9
| 409946 ||  || — || October 2, 2006 || Mount Lemmon || Mount Lemmon Survey || — || align=right data-sort-value="0.88" | 880 m || 
|-id=947 bgcolor=#E9E9E9
| 409947 ||  || — || October 21, 2006 || Mount Lemmon || Mount Lemmon Survey || — || align=right data-sort-value="0.94" | 940 m || 
|-id=948 bgcolor=#d6d6d6
| 409948 ||  || — || October 20, 2006 || Kitt Peak || Spacewatch || 3:2 || align=right | 4.7 km || 
|-id=949 bgcolor=#E9E9E9
| 409949 ||  || — || October 20, 2006 || Kitt Peak || Spacewatch || — || align=right data-sort-value="0.95" | 950 m || 
|-id=950 bgcolor=#E9E9E9
| 409950 ||  || — || October 21, 2006 || Kitt Peak || Spacewatch || EUN || align=right data-sort-value="0.96" | 960 m || 
|-id=951 bgcolor=#E9E9E9
| 409951 ||  || — || October 22, 2006 || Palomar || NEAT || — || align=right | 1.3 km || 
|-id=952 bgcolor=#E9E9E9
| 409952 ||  || — || October 23, 2006 || Kitt Peak || Spacewatch || — || align=right data-sort-value="0.91" | 910 m || 
|-id=953 bgcolor=#E9E9E9
| 409953 ||  || — || October 23, 2006 || Kitt Peak || Spacewatch || — || align=right | 1.1 km || 
|-id=954 bgcolor=#fefefe
| 409954 ||  || — || October 28, 2006 || Socorro || LINEAR || H || align=right data-sort-value="0.95" | 950 m || 
|-id=955 bgcolor=#fefefe
| 409955 ||  || — || October 21, 2006 || Palomar || NEAT || H || align=right data-sort-value="0.64" | 640 m || 
|-id=956 bgcolor=#E9E9E9
| 409956 ||  || — || September 25, 2006 || Mount Lemmon || Mount Lemmon Survey || — || align=right data-sort-value="0.76" | 760 m || 
|-id=957 bgcolor=#E9E9E9
| 409957 ||  || — || October 28, 2006 || Mount Lemmon || Mount Lemmon Survey || — || align=right | 1.1 km || 
|-id=958 bgcolor=#E9E9E9
| 409958 ||  || — || October 27, 2006 || Kitt Peak || Spacewatch || (5) || align=right data-sort-value="0.73" | 730 m || 
|-id=959 bgcolor=#FA8072
| 409959 ||  || — || October 27, 2006 || Kitt Peak || Spacewatch || — || align=right data-sort-value="0.75" | 750 m || 
|-id=960 bgcolor=#E9E9E9
| 409960 ||  || — || October 28, 2006 || Kitt Peak || Spacewatch || — || align=right data-sort-value="0.69" | 690 m || 
|-id=961 bgcolor=#E9E9E9
| 409961 ||  || — || September 25, 2006 || Kitt Peak || Spacewatch || — || align=right | 1.0 km || 
|-id=962 bgcolor=#E9E9E9
| 409962 ||  || — || October 16, 2006 || Apache Point || A. C. Becker || RAF || align=right data-sort-value="0.76" | 760 m || 
|-id=963 bgcolor=#E9E9E9
| 409963 ||  || — || October 22, 2006 || Catalina || CSS || (5) || align=right data-sort-value="0.79" | 790 m || 
|-id=964 bgcolor=#E9E9E9
| 409964 ||  || — || November 9, 2006 || Kitt Peak || Spacewatch || (5) || align=right data-sort-value="0.85" | 850 m || 
|-id=965 bgcolor=#E9E9E9
| 409965 ||  || — || November 9, 2006 || Kitt Peak || Spacewatch || — || align=right | 1.4 km || 
|-id=966 bgcolor=#E9E9E9
| 409966 ||  || — || September 27, 2006 || Mount Lemmon || Mount Lemmon Survey || — || align=right | 1.3 km || 
|-id=967 bgcolor=#E9E9E9
| 409967 ||  || — || September 28, 2006 || Mount Lemmon || Mount Lemmon Survey || — || align=right | 1.4 km || 
|-id=968 bgcolor=#E9E9E9
| 409968 ||  || — || November 10, 2006 || Kitt Peak || Spacewatch || EUN || align=right | 1.4 km || 
|-id=969 bgcolor=#E9E9E9
| 409969 ||  || — || October 13, 2006 || Kitt Peak || Spacewatch || — || align=right | 2.6 km || 
|-id=970 bgcolor=#E9E9E9
| 409970 ||  || — || November 12, 2006 || Mount Lemmon || Mount Lemmon Survey || — || align=right | 1.2 km || 
|-id=971 bgcolor=#E9E9E9
| 409971 ||  || — || November 10, 2006 || Kitt Peak || Spacewatch || — || align=right | 2.9 km || 
|-id=972 bgcolor=#E9E9E9
| 409972 ||  || — || November 11, 2006 || Kitt Peak || Spacewatch || EUN || align=right | 1.5 km || 
|-id=973 bgcolor=#E9E9E9
| 409973 ||  || — || November 11, 2006 || Kitt Peak || Spacewatch || KON || align=right | 9.9 km || 
|-id=974 bgcolor=#E9E9E9
| 409974 ||  || — || November 11, 2006 || Kitt Peak || Spacewatch || — || align=right data-sort-value="0.97" | 970 m || 
|-id=975 bgcolor=#E9E9E9
| 409975 ||  || — || September 28, 2006 || Mount Lemmon || Mount Lemmon Survey || — || align=right | 1.4 km || 
|-id=976 bgcolor=#E9E9E9
| 409976 ||  || — || November 14, 2006 || Socorro || LINEAR || — || align=right | 1.0 km || 
|-id=977 bgcolor=#E9E9E9
| 409977 ||  || — || November 14, 2006 || Socorro || LINEAR || RAF || align=right | 1.3 km || 
|-id=978 bgcolor=#E9E9E9
| 409978 ||  || — || November 15, 2006 || Catalina || CSS || — || align=right | 1.5 km || 
|-id=979 bgcolor=#E9E9E9
| 409979 ||  || — || November 15, 2006 || Mount Lemmon || Mount Lemmon Survey || — || align=right | 1.0 km || 
|-id=980 bgcolor=#E9E9E9
| 409980 ||  || — || September 26, 2006 || Mount Lemmon || Mount Lemmon Survey || — || align=right data-sort-value="0.98" | 980 m || 
|-id=981 bgcolor=#E9E9E9
| 409981 ||  || — || November 11, 2006 || Catalina || CSS || — || align=right data-sort-value="0.97" | 970 m || 
|-id=982 bgcolor=#E9E9E9
| 409982 ||  || — || November 13, 2006 || Kitt Peak || Spacewatch || — || align=right | 1.7 km || 
|-id=983 bgcolor=#E9E9E9
| 409983 ||  || — || November 13, 2006 || Kitt Peak || Spacewatch || — || align=right | 2.2 km || 
|-id=984 bgcolor=#E9E9E9
| 409984 ||  || — || September 27, 2006 || Mount Lemmon || Mount Lemmon Survey || (5) || align=right | 1.0 km || 
|-id=985 bgcolor=#E9E9E9
| 409985 ||  || — || November 15, 2006 || Mount Lemmon || Mount Lemmon Survey || EUN || align=right | 1.3 km || 
|-id=986 bgcolor=#E9E9E9
| 409986 ||  || — || November 15, 2006 || Socorro || LINEAR || EUN || align=right | 1.5 km || 
|-id=987 bgcolor=#E9E9E9
| 409987 ||  || — || September 27, 2006 || Mount Lemmon || Mount Lemmon Survey || — || align=right | 1.3 km || 
|-id=988 bgcolor=#E9E9E9
| 409988 ||  || — || November 15, 2006 || Catalina || CSS || — || align=right | 1.2 km || 
|-id=989 bgcolor=#E9E9E9
| 409989 ||  || — || October 20, 2006 || Mount Lemmon || Mount Lemmon Survey || — || align=right | 1.1 km || 
|-id=990 bgcolor=#E9E9E9
| 409990 ||  || — || November 15, 2006 || Catalina || CSS || — || align=right | 1.00 km || 
|-id=991 bgcolor=#E9E9E9
| 409991 ||  || — || October 19, 2006 || Mount Lemmon || Mount Lemmon Survey || (5) || align=right data-sort-value="0.94" | 940 m || 
|-id=992 bgcolor=#E9E9E9
| 409992 ||  || — || October 16, 2006 || Catalina || CSS || — || align=right data-sort-value="0.78" | 780 m || 
|-id=993 bgcolor=#E9E9E9
| 409993 ||  || — || November 14, 2006 || Catalina || CSS || — || align=right | 1.3 km || 
|-id=994 bgcolor=#E9E9E9
| 409994 ||  || — || September 30, 2006 || Mount Lemmon || Mount Lemmon Survey || EUN || align=right | 1.4 km || 
|-id=995 bgcolor=#FA8072
| 409995 ||  || — || November 21, 2006 || Socorro || LINEAR || — || align=right data-sort-value="0.81" | 810 m || 
|-id=996 bgcolor=#E9E9E9
| 409996 ||  || — || October 22, 2006 || Mount Lemmon || Mount Lemmon Survey || — || align=right data-sort-value="0.93" | 930 m || 
|-id=997 bgcolor=#E9E9E9
| 409997 ||  || — || November 16, 2006 || Socorro || LINEAR || — || align=right | 1.1 km || 
|-id=998 bgcolor=#E9E9E9
| 409998 ||  || — || November 16, 2006 || Mount Lemmon || Mount Lemmon Survey || — || align=right | 2.6 km || 
|-id=999 bgcolor=#E9E9E9
| 409999 ||  || — || November 17, 2006 || Catalina || CSS || — || align=right | 1.1 km || 
|-id=000 bgcolor=#E9E9E9
| 410000 ||  || — || November 17, 2006 || Mount Lemmon || Mount Lemmon Survey || (5) || align=right data-sort-value="0.96" | 960 m || 
|}

References

External links 
 Discovery Circumstances: Numbered Minor Planets (405001)–(410000) (IAU Minor Planet Center)

0409